= List of compositions by George Enescu =

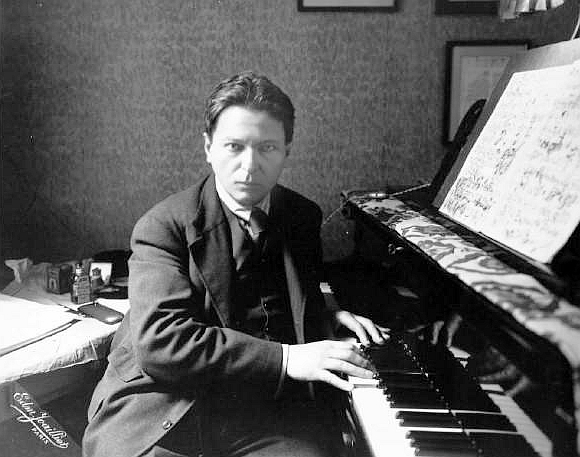
George Enescu in 1930

A number of compositions were created by the Romanian composer George Enescu.

== With opus number, by genre ==
=== Orchestral ===
==== Symphonies ====
- Op. 13: Symphony No. 1 in E♭ major (1905)
- Op. 17: Symphony No. 2 in A major (1912–1914)
- Op. 21: Symphony No. 3 in C major, with chorus (1916–1918)

==== Concerti ====
- Op. 8: Symphonie concertante in B minor, for cello and orchestra (1901)

==== Suites ====
- Op. 9: Orchestral Suite No. 1 in C major (1903)
- Op. 20: Orchestral Suite No. 2 in C major (1915)
- Op. 27: Orchestral Suite No. 3 in D major Suite villageoise (1937–1938)

==== Miscellaneous ====
- Op. 1: Poème roumain, symphonic suite for orchestra and wordless male choir (1897)
- Op. 11, No. 1: Romanian Rhapsody No. 1 in A major (1901)
- Op. 11, No. 2: Romanian Rhapsody No. 2 in D major (1901)
- Op. 12, No. 1: Intermède No. 1, for strings (1902)
- Op. 12, No. 2: Intermède No. 2, for strings (1903)
- Op. 32: Ouverture de concert sur des thèmes dans le caractère populaire roumain in A major (1948)
- Op. 31: Vox maris in G major, symphonic poem for tenor, three-part choir and orchestra (1954)

=== Chamber ===
==== Quartets/Quintets ====
- Op. 16: Piano Quartet No. 1 in D major (1909)
- Op. 22, No. 1: String Quartet No. 1 in E♭ major (1916–20)
- Op. 29: Piano Quintet in A minor (1940)
- Op. 30: Piano Quartet No. 2 in D minor (1943–44)
- Op. 22, No. 2: String Quartet No. 2 in G major (1950–52)

==== Sonatas ====
===== Violin =====
- Op. 2: Violin Sonata No. 1 in D major (1897)
- Op. 6: Violin Sonata No. 2 in F minor (1899)
- Op. 25: Violin Sonata No. 3 in A minor dans le caractère populaire roumain (1926)

===== Cello =====
- Op. 26, No. 1: Cello Sonata No. 1 in F minor (1898)
- Op. 26, No. 2: Cello Sonata No. 2 in C major (1935)

==== Miscellaneous ====
- Op. 7: Octet for Strings in C major (1900)
- Op. 14: Decet in D major, for wind instruments (1906)
- Op. 28: Impressions d'enfance, for violin and piano (1940)
- Op. 33: Chamber Symphony, for 12 instruments (1954)

=== Piano ===
- Op. 3: Piano Suite No. 1 in G minor Dans le style ancien (1897)
- Op. 5: Variations for Two Pianos on an Original Theme in A♭ major (1898)
- Op. 10: Piano Suite No. 2 in D major Des cloches sonores (1903)
- Op. 18: Piano Suite No.3 Pièces impromptues (1913–16)
- Op. 24, No. 1: Piano Sonata No. 1 in F♯ minor (1924)
- [Piano Sonata No. 2 does not exist]
- Op. 24, No. 3: Piano Sonata No. 3 in D major (1933–35)

=== Opera ===
- Op. 23: Œdipe, tragédie lyrique in four acts, libretto by Edmond Fleg (1910–31)

=== Songs ===
- Op. 4: Trois Mélodies sur poèmes de Jules Lemaitre et Sully Prudhomme, for bass and piano (1898)
  - Le Désert
  - Le Galop
  - Soupir
- Op. 15: Sept Chansons de Clement Marot, for tenor and piano (1907–08)
  - Estrenne à Anne
  - Languir me fais
  - Aux Damoyselles paresseusses
  - Estrenne de la rose
  - Présent de le couleur blanche
  - Changeons propos
  - Du Conflict en douleur
- Op. 19: Trois Mélodies sur poèmes de Fernand Gregh (1915–16)
  - Pluie
  - Le Silence musicien
  - L'Ombre est bleue

== Works without opus number, by genre ==
=== Orchestral ===
==== Symphonies ====
- Study Symphony No. 1 in D minor (1895)
- Study Symphony No. 2 in F major (1895)
- Study Symphony No. 3 in F major (1896)
- Study Symphony No. 4 in E♭ major (1898)
- Symphony No. 4 in E minor (unfinished, 1934; completed by Pascal Bentoiu)
- Symphony No. 5 in D major, with tenor and female choir (unfinished, 1941; completed by Pascal Bentoiu)

==== Concerti ====
- Ballade, for violin and orchestra, Op. 4a (1895)
- Fantaisie, for piano and orchestra (1896)
- Caprice Roumain, for violin and orchestra (unfinished, 1928; completed by Cornel Țăranu)

==== Miscellaneous ====
- Three Overtures for orchestra (1891–94)
- Sonata for Orchestra (1894)
- Tragic Overture (1895)
- Andantino from an orchestral suite (1896)
- Triumphal Overture (1896)
- Four Divertissements for orchestra (1896)
- Pastorale-Fantaisie for orchestra (1899)
- Isis, symphonic poem (unfinished, 1923; completed by Pascal Bentoiu)
- Suite châtelaine, for orchestra (unfinished, 1911; completed by Remus Georgescu)

=== Chamber ===
==== Trios/Quartets/Quintets ====
- Quartet for four violins (1894)
- Piano Quintet (1896)
- Piano Trio in G minor (1897)
- Trio for two violins and cello (c.1899)
- Aubade, Trio for violin, viola and cello (1899)
- Sérénade lointaine, for violin, cello and piano (1903)
- Piano Trio in A minor (1916)
- Piano Trio (unfinished, 1942, completed by Pascal Bentoiu)

==== Miscellaneous ====
- Opera, for violin and piano (1886)
- Suite of variations for two violins (1894)
- Tarantelle for violin and piano (1895)
- Violin Sonata (1895)
- Nocturne and Saltarello, for cello (1897)
- Prélude, for two pianos, violin and cello (1898)
- Sérénade en sourdine, for violin and cello (c.1899)
- Andante religioso, for two cellos and organ (1900)
- Pastorale, menuet triste et nocturne, for violin and piano, four hands (1900)
- Wind Septet, for flute, oboe, cor anglais, clarinet, bassoon, horn and piano (1900)
- Impromptu concertant in G♭ major, for violin and piano (1903)
- Cantabile et presto, for flute and piano (1904)
- Allegro de concert, for chromatic harp (1904)
- Concertstück, for viola and piano (1906)
- Légende, for trumpet and piano (1906)
- Au soir, poem for four trumpets (1906)
- Morceau de déchiffrer, for horn and piano (1908)
- Aria and Scherzino, for violin, viola, cello, double bass and piano (1909)
- Hora Unirei, for violin and piano (1917)

=== Piano ===
- Waltz (1887)
- Pièce d'église (1889)
- Rondo and Variations (1893)
- Ballade (1894)
- Introduction, Adagio and Allegro (1894)
- Piano Sonata (1894)
- Polka (1894–1895)
- Sonatina, for four hands (1894–95)
- Romance, for four hands (1894–95)
- Four-part fugue on an original subject (1895–96)
- Prélude et Scherzo in F♯ minor (1896)
- Barcarolle, in B♭ (1897)
- La Fileuse, in D (1897)
- Regrets, in G♭ (1898)
- Impromptu, in A♭ (1898)
- Suite for piano, four hands (1898)
- Modérément (1898)
- Allemande (c.1899)
- Impromptu, in C (1900)
- Prélude et fugue (1903)
- Nocturne (1907)
- Sonatensatz, in F♯ minor (1912)
- Pièce sur le nom de Fauré (1922)

=== Vocal/Choral ===
==== Cantatas ====
- Vision de Saül (1895)
- L'Aurore (1898)
- Cantate pour la pose de la prèmiere pierre du pont à transbordeur de Bordeaux, for military band, two harps, string orchestra, solo cello, choir, baritone solo, and cannons, verses by Albert Bureau (1908)

==== Lieder ====
- Pensée perdue, on verses by Sully Prudhomme (1898)
- Wüstenbild, on verses by A. Roderich
- Chant indou, on verses by Mlle Géraldine Rolland (c.1898)
- Dédicace (1899)
- De ziua ta (1900)
- Si j'étais Dieu, on verses by Sully Prudhomme (1897–1898)
- Quarantine, on verses by Enescu (1899)
- Prinz Waldvogelsgesang for voice, cello and piano (1901)
- Ein Sonnenblick (1901)
- De la flûte au cor, on verses by Fernand Gregh (1902)
- Silence, on verses by Albert Samain (1905)
- Doina, for baritone, viola and cello, on folk verses from a collection by Vasile Alecsandri (1905)
- Morgengebet (1908)
- Eu mă duc, Codrul Rămîne (c.1917)
- On the verses of Carmen Sylva:
  - Sphinx (1898)
  - Der Bläser (1898)
  - Zaghaft (1898)
  - Armes Mägdlein (1898)
  - Junge Schmerzen, for mezzo-soprano, bass and piano (1898)
  - Der Schmetterlingskuss (1898)
  - Reue (1898)
  - Schlaflos (1898)
  - Maurerlied (1899)
  - Königshusarenlied (1899)
  - Souhait (1899)
  - Mittagsläuten (1900)
  - Regen (1903)
  - Die Kirschen for soprano, baritone, cello and piano (1904)
  - Entsagen (1907)

==== Miscellaneous ====
- Waldesgesang, for mixed choir a cappella (1898)
- Die nächtliche Heerschau, for baritone, choir and orchestra, on verses by Joseph Christian Zedlitz (1900)
- Plugar, for mixed four-part choir a cappella, on verses by Radulescu-Niger (1900)
- Oda, for choir and piano or organ, on verses by I. Soricu (1904)
- Hymn jubiliar, for choir, military band and harp (1906)
- Strigoii, for soprano, tenor, baritone, chorus and orchestra, on verses by Eminescu (unfinished, 1916; completed by Cornel Țăranu)

== Unfinished works, chronologically ==
- Piano Quartet (fragment;1893)
- String Quartet, in C major (fragment; 1894)
- String Quartet, in D minor (fragment; 1894)
- Ahasvérus, cantata (prologue only; 1895)
- Violin Concerto, in A minor (two movements; 1896)
- String Quartet (1896)
- Two Romanian Suites for orchestra (1896–1897)
- String Quartet (first movement; 1897)
- Barcarolle, for piano (1897)
- Octet for strings, in D major (fragment; 1898)
- Moderato for violin and piano, in F minor (fragment; c.1898)
- Piano Concerto, in D minor (draft of first movement; c.1898)
- Piano Concerto, in E minor (draft of first movement; c.1898)
- Suite Orientale, for orchestra (fragment; 1900)
- String Quartet, in C major (one movement only; 1906)
- Violin Sonata, in A minor (first movement 'Torso'; 1911)
- Piano Sonata in F♯ minor (first movement; 1912)
- Symphony, in F minor, for baritone, choir and orchestra, on the words of Psalm 86 (fragments; c.1917)
- Symphonie concertante, in C major, for violin and orchestra (draft; 1932)
- Voix de la nature, symphonic suite (one movement, 'Nuages d'automne sur les forêts'; 1931-39)
- Linişte, for choir of three equal voices a cappella, on verses by Al. T. Stamatiad (brief extracts; 1946)
- Allegro for chamber orchestra (draft)
- Nocturne 'Ville d'Avrayen' for piano quartet (draft)

In addition to all of the unfinished works above, drafts of five other string quartets, eight other cantatas (among them La fille de Jepthé, Antigone, Daphne) and Act I of a 'drame lyrique', Le lotus bleu, were found, all of which were dated before 1900.
