= Cello Sonata No. 2 (Enescu) =

Composition for cello and piano by George Enescu

- Chamber music by George Enescu
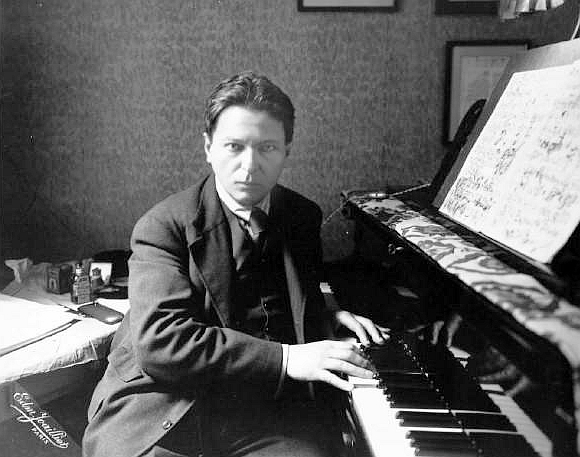
- George Enesco in 1930
- Key: C major
- Opus: 26, No. 2
- Composed: 1935
- Dedication: Pablo Casals
- Performed: 4 March 1936 École Normale de Musique de Paris
- Duration: 30 min
- Movements: 4

The Cello Sonata No. 2 in C major, Op. 26, No. 2, is a sonata for cello and piano by the Romanian composer George Enescu, written in 1935. A performance lasts about 30 minutes.

== History ==
Enescu began composing his second cello sonata in Tescani, probably in June 1935, and finished it the following November. The first and second movements were completed in Bucharest on 8 August and 12 September, respectively. The third and fourth movements were completed in Vienna, on 27 September and 30 November.

The sonata is dedicated to Pablo Casals and was premiered at the École Normale de Musique in Paris on 4 March 1936, by the cellist Diran Alexanian with Enescu at the piano.

The opus number 26, which Enescu assigned to this work, is chronologically appropriate relative to the preceding Third Violin Sonata, Op. 25, and the following Third Orchestral Suite, Op. 27. What is odd is that he chose to include with it the very much earlier Sonata in F Minor (1898), written before the Second Violin Sonata, Op. 6, publishing the two cello sonatas as a pair: Op. 26, Nos. 1 and 2.

== Analysis ==
The Cello Sonata is in four movements:

1. Allegro moderato ed amabile
2. Allegro agitato, non troppo mosso
3. Andantino cantabile, senza lentezza
4. Final a la roumaine, Allegro sciolto

Although the broad outline of the work follows the classical model of a four-movement sonata, Enescu’s working-out of the internal structures of the movements is not easy to fit to the conventional schemes. A certain mobility in the transformation of the musical material reaches solutions similar to those of the Classical era, but interpreted and altered according to the composer’s personal taste.

The first movement is relatively unproblematic, cast in a sonata-allegro form. The first theme is expansive, and falls into two large parts, with the piano and cello in a generally heterophonic relationship. Its structure is complicated by being stated twice, separated by a developmental passage on the second part of the theme. The secondary, rather Schumanesque theme is assigned mainly to the piano, with occasional pizzicato interjections by the cello. The development is fairly conventional, but the recapitulation is unusually concise, and is followed by a lengthy coda.

The structure of the second movement is much more problematic. While one analyst sees it as a somewhat blurred ternary scherzo. another argues for "a new original structure, superimposing a sonata-form—with exposition, development and recapitulation—to the principles of the fugue", quoted in Bentoiu, while yet another sees it as nearly a textbook example of an ABA scherzo, though including the cyclical return of nearly the entire main theme of the first movement.

The third, slow movement may be seen as a theme and variations or, alternatively, as a dreamlike sonata form. The rhythm throughout the movement is in the "parlando-rubato" style characteristic of Romanian folk music.

The finale is sometimes claimed to be a rondo, at other times a sonata-rondo, whereas Pascal Bentoiu maintains that it "contains all the elements to qualify without hesitation for a sonata form".

== Discography ==
Listed chronologically by date of recording.

- George Enescu: Compozitor și interpret / Composer & Performer. Includes Op. 26, No. 2, Theodor Lupu, cello; George Enescu, piano. Recorded for the Romanian Radio, 1943. CD recording, 2 discs: digital, 4¾ in., monaural. Bucharest: Romanian Radio Broadcasting Corporation, 2005.
- George Enescu: Impressions d'enfance, pour violin et piano, op. 28; Sonate no. 2 en ut majeur pour piano et violoncelle, op. 26. Stefan Gheorghiu, violin; Valentin Gheorghiu, piano (Op. 28); Ion Fotino, cello; Maria Fotino, piano (Op. 26). LP recording, 1 disc: 12 in, 33⅓ rpm, monaural. Electrecord ECE 076. Bucharest: Electrecord, 1961.
- George Enescu: Sonata nr. 2 pentru pian și vioară in fa minor, op. 6; Sonata nr. 2 pentru pian și violoncel in Do major, op. 26, nr. 2. Varujan Cozighian, violin; Valentin Gheorghiu, piano (Op. 6); Alexandra Guțu, cello; Elena Cosma, piano (Op. 26). LP recording, 1 disc: 12 in, 33⅓ rpm, stereo. Electrecord ST-ECE 01804. Bucharest: Electrecord, 1981.
- Works by Debussy, Enescu, Janácek and Kodály. Enescu: Cello Sonata No. 2 in C major Op. 26 No. 2; Anssi Karttunen, cello; Tuija Hakkila, piano. Finlandia Records CD (Warner), 1990.
- George Enescu: Sonate für Klavier fis-moll op. 24/1; Sonate für Klavier und Violoncello op. 26/2; Rapsodia Romina für Klavier, op. 11/1. Lory Wallfisch, piano; Julien Musafia, piano (Op. 11, No. 1); Julius Berger, cello (Op. 26, No. 2). Recorded. 25–27 October 1993, in the Konzerthaus, Kronberg/Taunus. CD recording, 1 disc: digital, 4¾ in., stereo. EBS 6043. Bietigheim-Bissingen: EBS Records, 1995.
- George Enescu: Cello Sonatas, Op. 26, Nos. 1 and 2. Gerhard Zank, cello; Donald Sulzen, piano. Recorded 8, 11, 12 June 1997, Bürgerhaus Pullach. CD recording, 1 disc: digital, 4¾ in., stereo. [S.l.]: Arte Nova Classics, 1997.
- George Enescu: 2 Sonatas for Cello and Piano; Nocturne and Saltarello. Viviane Spanoghe, cello; André De Groote, piano. CD recording, 1 disc: digital, 4¾ in., stereo. Talent DOM 2910 79, Antwerp: Classic Talent, 2002.
- Kodály, Martinů, Enescu, Janáček. Edda Erlendsdottir, piano; Bryndis Halla Gylfadottir, cello. CD recording, 1 disc: digital, 4¾ in., stereo. Erma 200.006 [?5637285413]. [Iceland]: [S.n.], 2005.
- George Enescu: Cello Sonatas. Laura Buruiana, cello; Martin Tchiba, piano. Recorded 26–29 August 2007, Muziekcentrum Frits Philips, Eindhoven, The Netherlands. CD recording, 1 disc: digital, 4¾ in., stereo. Naxos 8570582. [Hong Kong]: Naxos, 2008.
- Enescu: Complete Works for Cello and Piano. Valentin Radutiu, cello; Per Rundberg, piano. CD recording, 1 disc: digital, 4¾ in., stereo. Hänssler Classic 98021. 2013.
