= Piano Quintet (Enescu) =

- Chamber music by George Enescu
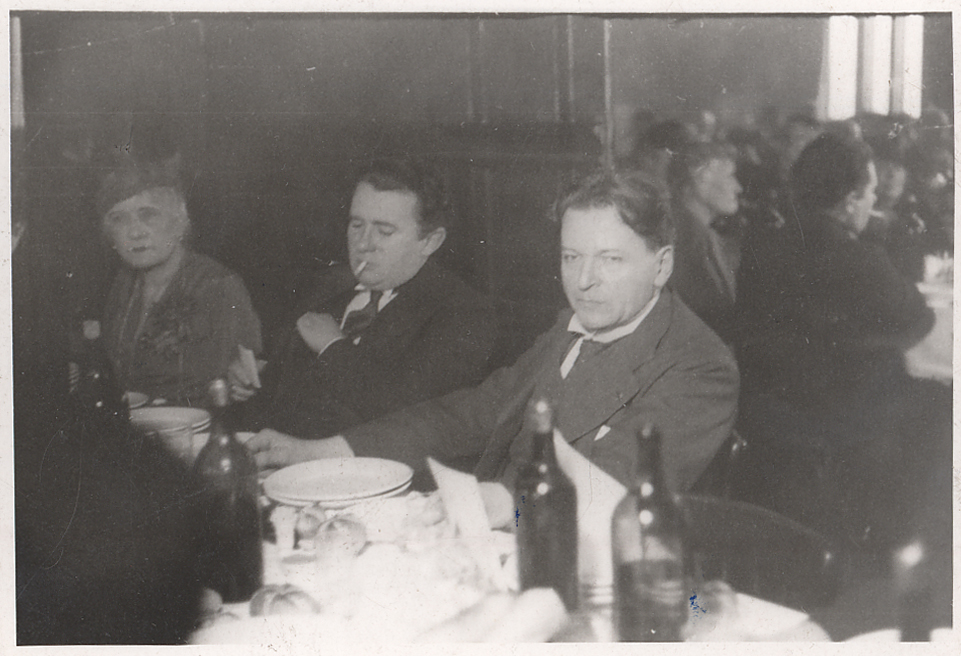
- Enescu in the 1940s
- Key: A minor
- Opus: 29
- Composed: 1940
- Dedication: Princess Elena Bibescu
- Performed: 1964 Bucharest
- Movements: 4
- Scoring: piano; 2 violins; viola; cello

The Piano Quintet in A minor, Op. 29, is a chamber music work by the Romanian composer George Enescu, written in 1940.

== History ==
The year 1940 was comparatively quiet for Enescu. Romania had not yet entered the Second World War, and his schedule of concerts was not as intense as had been the case in the First World War, which gave him time to complete two major compositions, the Impressions d'enfance for violin and piano, and the Piano Quintet. The manuscript of the Quintet indicates that the first pair of movements was completed at Enescu's villa Luminiș in Sinaia on 24 September 1940, but the remaining pair of movements is undated, and Enescu continued making small revisions as late as 1949. The score is dedicated to the memory of the pianist (and Enescu's early patron) Princess Elena Bibescu. The work was not performed in Enescu's lifetime, but was finally premiered in Bucharest in 1964 by (amongst others) Valentin Gheorghiu, piano, and Ștefan Gheorghiu, first violin.

== Analysis ==
The Quintet is in four movements, grouped in two "commanding musical blocks" of two movements each:

1. Con moto molto moderato
2. Andante sostenuto e cantabile
3. Vivace, ma non troppo
4. Più tranquillo

The overriding feature of the cyclic melodic material that contributes to unifying all of the movements of this Quintet is the constant presence of a "modal fifth": a formula that fits each of the motives within the framework of a perfect fifth, thus establishing an underlying pentachordal modal torso. Put another way, the displayed motives may be regarded as various kinds of melodic "disguisings" of the modal fifth over the course of the Quintet.

== Discography ==
Chronologically, by date of recording.

- George Enescu: Piano Quintet in A Minor, Op. 29. Valentin Gheorghiu, piano; Ștefan Gheorghiu, George Nicolescu, violins; Valeriu Pitulac, viola; Aurel Niculescu, cello. LP recording, 1 disc: 12 in., 33⅓ rpm, stereo. Electrecord ST-ECE 01913. Bucharest: Electrecord, 1977. (reissued 1981)
- George Enescu: Piano Quintet in A Minor, Op. 29. Yvonne Piedemonte-Prelipcean piano; Voces Quartet (Bujor Prelipcean, Anton Diaconu, violins; Gheorghe Haag, viola; Dan Prelipcean, cello). 12 in., 33⅓ rpm, stereo. Electrecord ST-ECE 01855. Bucharest: Electrecord, 1981.
- George Enescu: Octet, Op. 7; Quintet, Op. 29. Kremerata Baltica, Gidon Kremer, cond. (Octet); Andrius Zlabys, piano; Gidon Kremer, Dzeraldas Bidva, violins; Ula Ulijona, viola; Marta Sudraba, cello (Quintet). Octet recorded June 2000 at the Angelika-Kauffmann-Saal, Schwarzenberg, Austria; Quintet recorded November 2001 at the Probesaal der Philharmonie Rheinland-Pfalz, Ludwigshafen, Germany. CD recording, 1 disc: 4¾ in., stereo. Nonesuch 79682-2.New York: Nonesuch Records, 2002.
- George Enescu: Piano Quintet, Op. 29; Piano Quartet No. 2, Op. 30. The Solomon Ensemble (Dominic Saunders, piano; Anne Solomon, Andrew Roberts, violins; Ralf Ehlers, viola; Rebecca Gilliver, cello). Recorded at Potton Hall, Suffolk, England, 22–24 September 2001. CD recording, 1 disc: 4¾ in., stereo. Naxos 8.557159. [Canada]: HNH International, 2003.
- George Enescu: Piano Trio; Piano Quintet; Aria and Scherzino. Remus Azoitei, violin; Schubert Ensemble (Simon Blendis and Alexandra Wood, violins; Douglas Paterson, viola; Jane Salmon, cello; Peter Buckoke, double bass; William Howard, piano). Recorded Potten Hall, Dunwich, Suffolk, 1–2 October 2012 (Piano Trio); 22–23 January 2013 (Quintet; Aria and Scherzino). CD recording, 1 disc: 4¾ in., stereo. Chandos CHAN 10790. Colchester: Chandos Records Ltd., 2013.
