= Five lei =

- Country: Romania
- Value: 5 Romanian lei
- Width: 127 mm
- Height: 67 mm
- Security features: watermark, security thread, transparent window, microprinting, blacklight printing, EURion constellation
- Material used: polymer
- Years of printing: since 2005

Obverse
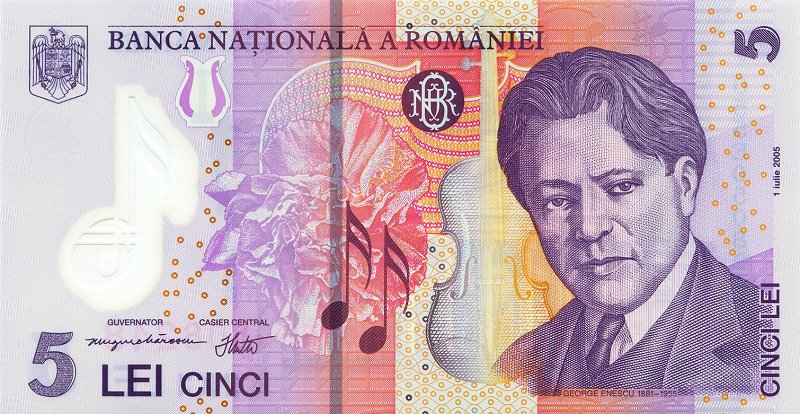
- Design: George Enescu, Carnation, violin
- Designer: National Bank of Romania
- Design date: 2005

Reverse
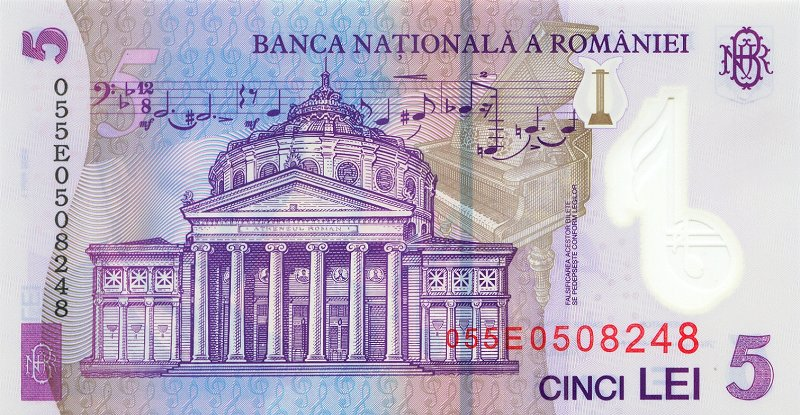
- Design: Romanian Athenaeum, piano, line from the Œdipe opera
- Designer: National Bank of Romania
- Design date: 2005

The five lei banknote is one of the circulating denomination of the Romanian leu. It is the same size as the 10 Euro banknote.

The main color of the banknote is purple. It pictures, on the obverse composer and violinist George Enescu, and on the reverse the Romanian Athenaeum, headquarters of the George Enescu Philharmonic Orchestra, a piano, and a line from his opera, Œdipe .

== History ==
In the past, the denomination was also in the coin form, as follows:

five lei (1867-1947)

- banknote issue: 1877 (the hypothecary issue)
- coin issues: 1880, 1881 (re-issues: 1882, 1883, 1884, 1885), 1901, 1906 (gold, celebration issue)
- banknote issues: 1914 (re-issues: 1916, 1917, 1920, 1928, 1929), 1917 (issued by the Romanian General Bank and circulated in the German occupation area between 1917-1918)
- coin issues: 1930, 1942
- banknote issue: 1944 (issued by the Red Army Comandament and circulated in 1944)

Second leu (1947-1952)

- coin issues: 1947, 1948 (re-issues: 1949, 1950)

Third leu - ROL (1952-2005)

- banknote issues: 1952, 1966
- coin issues: 1978, 1992 (re-issues: 1993, 1994, 1995)

Fourth leu - RON (since 2005)

- banknote issue: 2005 (redesigned issue of the former 50.000 lei banknote, whereas 50.000 third lei = 5 fourth lei)

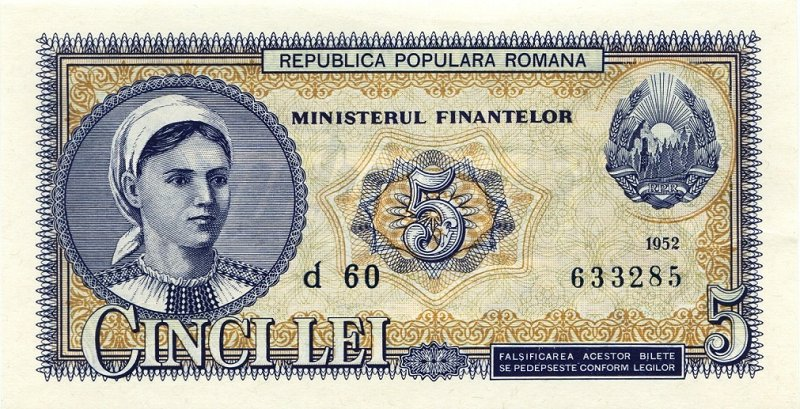
Obverse

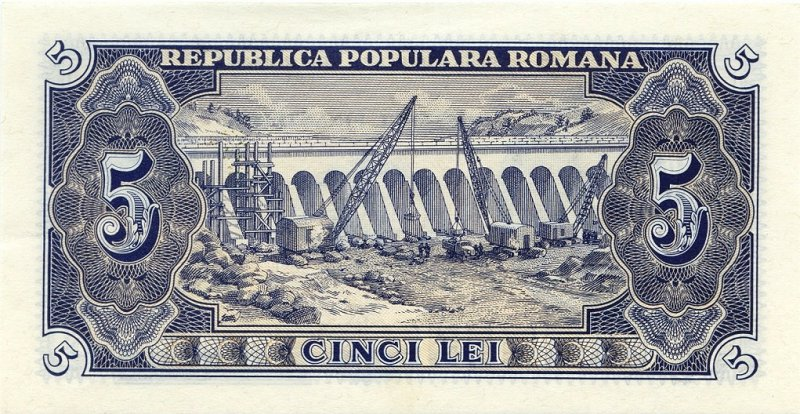
Reverse

1952 5 lei issue

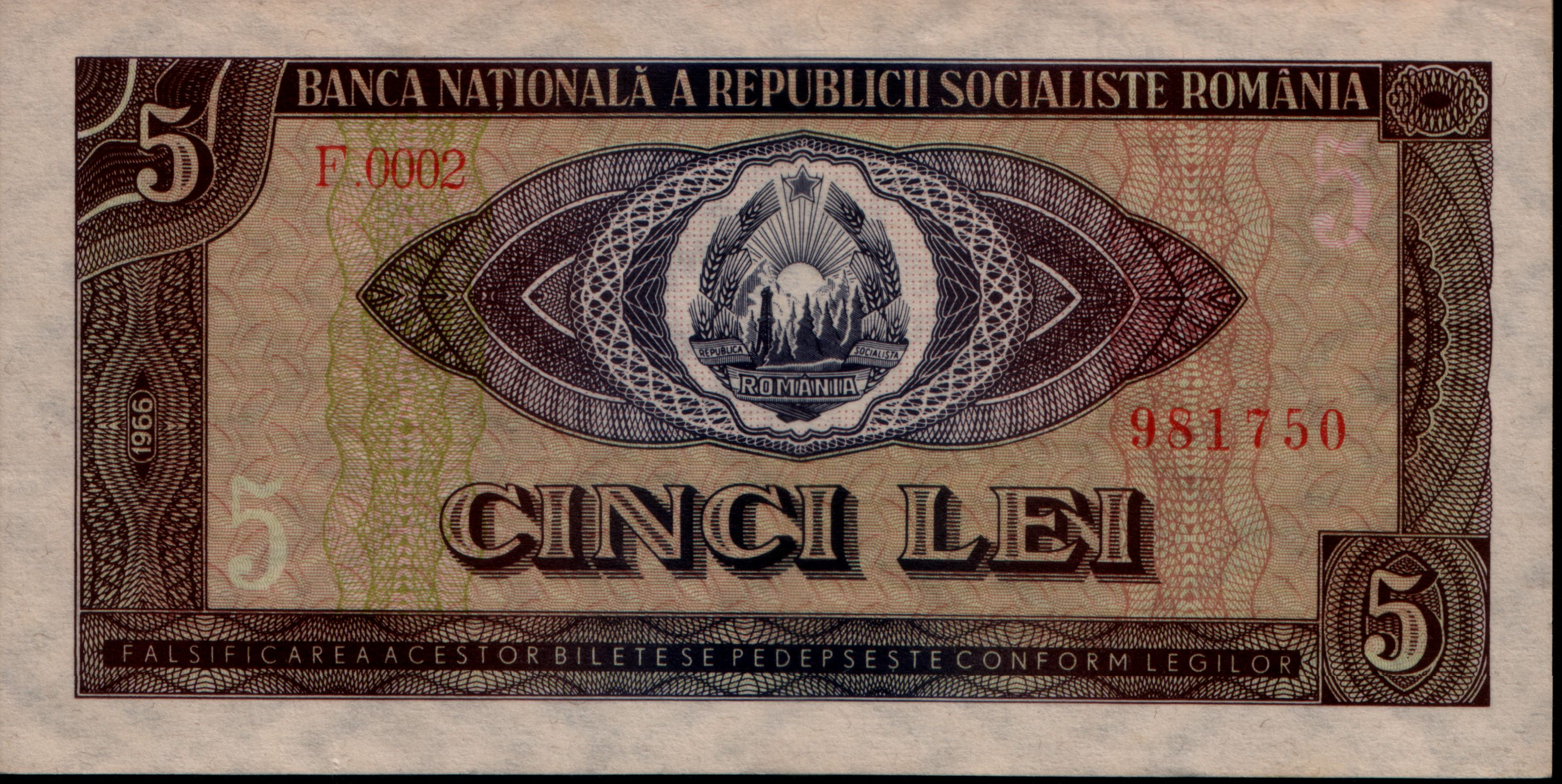
Obverse

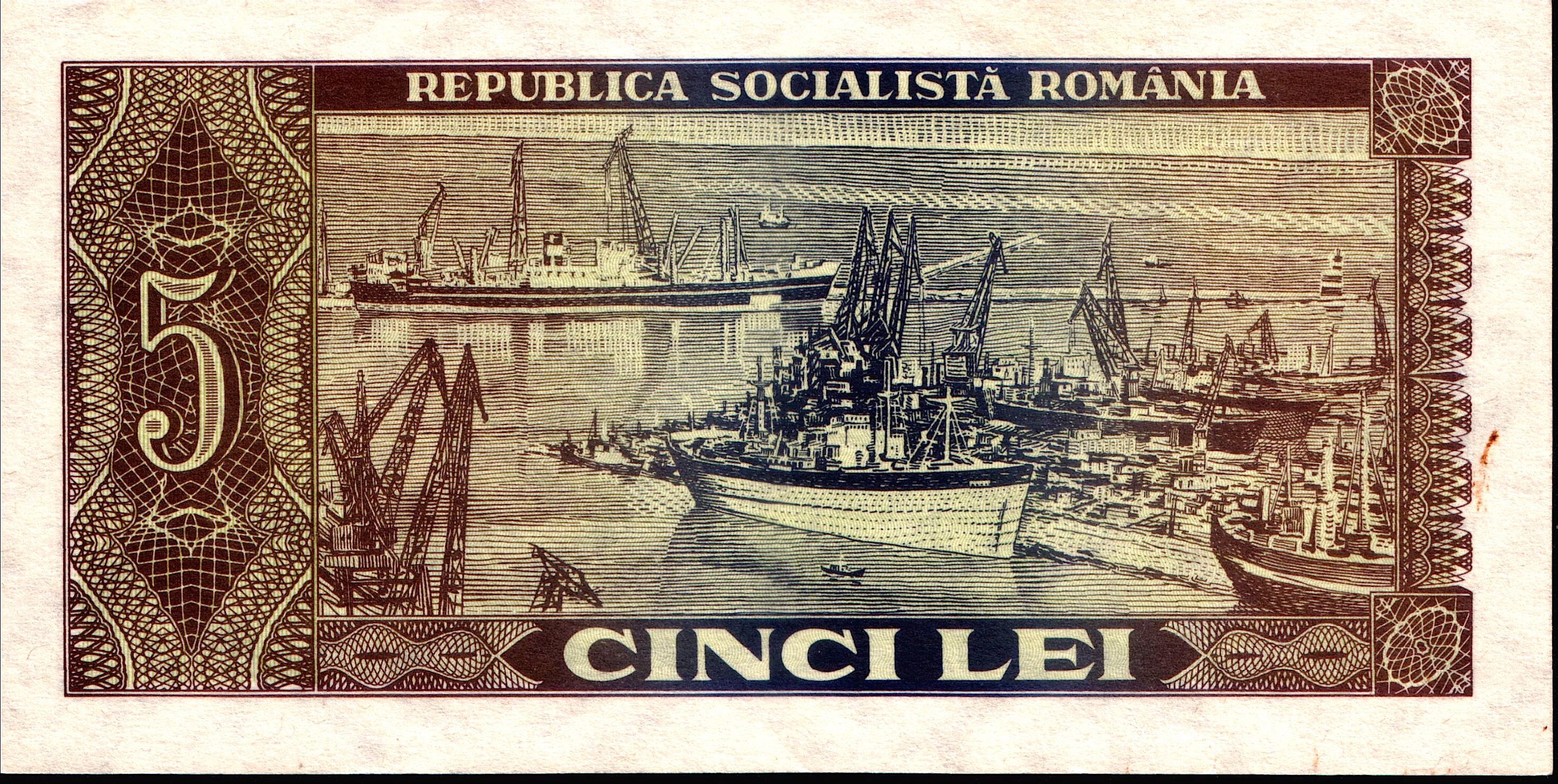
Reverse

1966 5 lei issue
