= Violin Sonata No. 3 (Enescu) =

Composition for violin and piano by George Enescu

- Chamber music by George Enescu
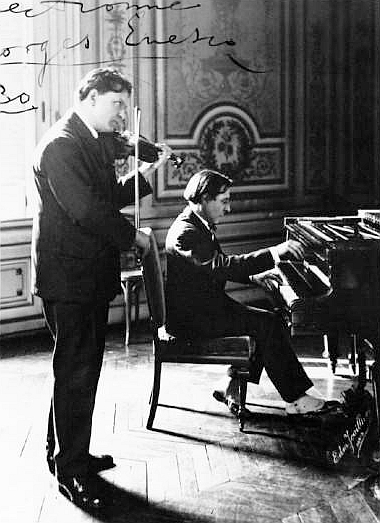
- George Enescu (left) and Alfred Cortot in 1930
- Key: A minor
- Opus: 25
- Composed: 1926
- Dedication: Franz Kneisel
- Performed: January 1927, Oradea
- Published: 1933
- Movements: 3
- Scoring: violin; piano

The Sonata No. 3 in A minor "dans le caractère populaire roumain" (in Romanian Folk Style) for violin and piano, Op. 25, is a chamber music composition written in 1926 by the Romanian composer George Enescu. The score, published in 1933, is dedicated to the memory of the violinist Franz Kneisel. It is one of the composer's most popular and at the same time most critically respected works.

== History ==
The Third Violin Sonata was written in a span of about four months in 1926 at a time when Enescu was also occupied with the late stages of work on the opera Œdipe. The sonata was first performed in Oradea, in January 1927 by the composer and the pianist Nicolae Caravia, who repeated it shortly afterward in Bucharest. Enescu and Caravia also gave the Paris premiere in March 1927, in the Salle Gaveau. A particularly notable early performance took place in Paris in June 1930, when the composer was partnered by Alfred Cortot. Enescu's pupil Yehudi Menuhin made a recording in 1936 with his sister Hephzibah Menuhin on piano, and the composer himself recorded the work twice as a violinist, in 1943 with Dinu Lipatti and again a few years later with Céliny Chaillez-Richez. A performance took place in May 1946 with Yehudi Menuhin playing the violin part, accompanied on the piano by the composer.

The sonata prompted enthusiasm immediately at the time of its premiere, and has ever since been the composition by Enescu that has received the greatest amount of attention in the musicological and critical literature, with the possible exception of his opera, Œdipe. It has also become the most popular of Enescu's works after the two Romanian Rhapsodies.

== Analysis ==
Without ever quoting actual folk tunes, the material possesses the authenticity of a sort of "super folklore". The violin is cast in the role of a gypsy fiddle, and the writing for the piano imitates the cimbalom and kobza.

The sonata is divided into three movements:

1. Moderato malinconico
2. Andante sostenuto e misterioso
3. Allegro con brio, ma non troppo mosso

The first movement is in a loose sonata-allegro form, beginning with a suave and nostalgic first thematic group presented in continuous and supple lines in the piano and more hesitantly in the violin. When this material returns in the recapitulation it will be transformed into a kind of "horă bătrînească" (old men's dance). The second thematic group brings a contrasting atmosphere of sobriety and intensified differentiation of colour, a characteristic that will return for further development in the second movement. The development is confined almost entirely to material from the first thematic group, but after the recapitulation there is an extended coda that brings together motivic fragments from both groups. The transformation of the material from the lyrical, songlike style of the exposition and development into the persistent dance rhythms of the recapitulation bestows upon the movement the overall impression of a two-part rhapsody in the traditional lassú–friss pattern.

The second movement can be described as a song form in three parts: a long opening section filled with introspection and poetic facets, where the violin plays almost entirely in harmonics, followed by a contrasting central section in folk style, and a return of the opening material with a concluding, gentle coda.

The finale is in rondo form using a refrain whose melody is reminiscent of a bear dance from northern Moldavia. Despite the sectional form, the thematic material is subjected to continuous variation—a process made particularly clear in the C section, which is structured as a miniature theme and variations. This procedure results in an effect described as Enescu's "rhapsodic style".

== Discography ==
- George Enescu: Sonata No. 3 for Violin and Piano in A minor, Op. 25. Yehudi Menuhin, violin; Hephzibah Menuhin, piano. Recorded 6 January 1936. A Victor Musical Masterpiece. 78 rpm recording, 3 sound discs: analog, 78 rpm, monaural, 12 in. Victor DM 318 (set: automatic sequence); Victor 16892; 16893; 16894; Victor AM 318 (set: automatic sequence). Camden, N.J.: Victor, 1940. Reissued together with other material. CD recording, 1 sound disc: digital, monaural, 4¾ in. EMI Classics 7243 5 65962 2. EMI Références series. [London]: EMI Classics, 1996.
- George Enescu: Sonata No. 3 for Violin and Piano in A Minor, Op. 25 (în caracter populare românesc); Pièce de concert for Viola and Piano. George Enescu, violin; Dinu Lipatti, piano (1st work); Alexandru Radulescu, viola; George Enescu, piano (2nd work). LP recording, 1 sound disc: analog, 33⅓ rpm, monaural, 10 in. Electrecord ECD 95. [Romania]: Electrecord, 1950s.
- George Enescu: Sonata No. 3 in A minor for Violin and Piano, Op. 25 ("in the popular Roumanian style"). Leoš Janáček: Sonata for Violin and Piano. Rafael Druian, violin; John Simms, piano. LP recording, 1 sound disc: 33⅓ rpm, monaural, 12 in. Mercury MG 80001. [n.p.]: Mercury Records, 1956.
- George Enescu: Sonata No. 3 in A minor for violin and piano, Op. 25; Darius Milhaud: Sonata No. 2 for Violin and Piano, Op. 40. Diane Andersen, violin; André Gertler, piano. LP recording, 1 disc: analogue, 33⅓ rpm, stereo, 12 in. Supraphon 50483, Czechoslovakia: Supraphon, 1962.
- George Enuscu: Sonata No. 3 in A Minor for Violin and Piano, Op. 26 (dans le style populaire roumaine). Christian Ferras, violin; Pierre Barbizet, piano. LP recording, 1 sound disc: analog, 33⅓ rpm, stereo, 12 in. Odeon S 80749. [n.p.]: Odeon, 1960s.
- West Meets East. Ravi Shankar: Prabhati, Raga puriya kalyan, Swara-kakali; George Enescu: Sonata No. 3 in A minor for Violin and Piano, Op. 25. Yehudi Menuhin, violin (1st, 3rd, and 4th works); Ravi Shankar, sitar (2nd and 3rd works); Alla Rakha, tabla (1st work); Hephzibah Menuhin, piano (4th work). LP recording, 1 sound disc: analogue, stereo, 33⅓ rpm, 12 in. Angel S 36418. London: Angel, 1967.
- George Enescu: Sonata No. 3 in A minor for Violin and Piano, Op. 25; Antonín Dvořák: Romantické kusy, Op. 75; Robert Schumann: Intermezzo and Allegro (second and third movements of the F.A.E. Sonata); Johannes Brahms: Sonatensatz (Scherzo of the F.A.E. Sonata). Isaac Stern, violin; Alexander Zakin, piano. LP recording, 1 sound disc: analog, 33⅓ rpm, stereo, 12 in. CBS Masterworks M 39114. New York: CBS Masterworks, 1983.
- George Enescu: Violin Sonata No. 2, Op. 6; Violin Sonata "Torso"; Violin Sonata No. 3, Op. 25. Adelina Oprean, violin; Justin Oprean, piano. CD recording, 1 disc: digital, stereo, 4¾ in. Hyperion CDA66484. London: Hyperion Records Ltd, 1992.
