= String Quartet No. 1 (Enescu) =

Chamber music work by George Enescu

String Quartet
- No. 1
- by George Enescu
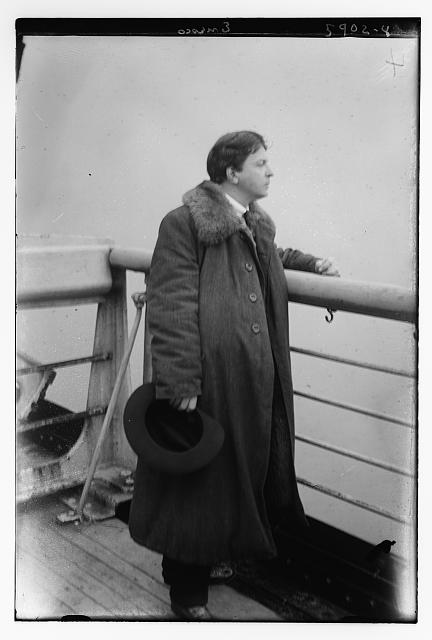
- George Enescu in 1922
- Key: E-flat major
- Opus: 22, No. 1
- Composed: 1916–1920
- Performed: 5 February 1921
- Duration: 45 min
- Movements: Four

The String Quartet No. 1 in E-flat major, Op. 22, No. 1, is a chamber music work by the Romanian violinist and composer George Enescu, composed between 1916 and 1920. A performance of it lasts about 45 minutes.

== History ==
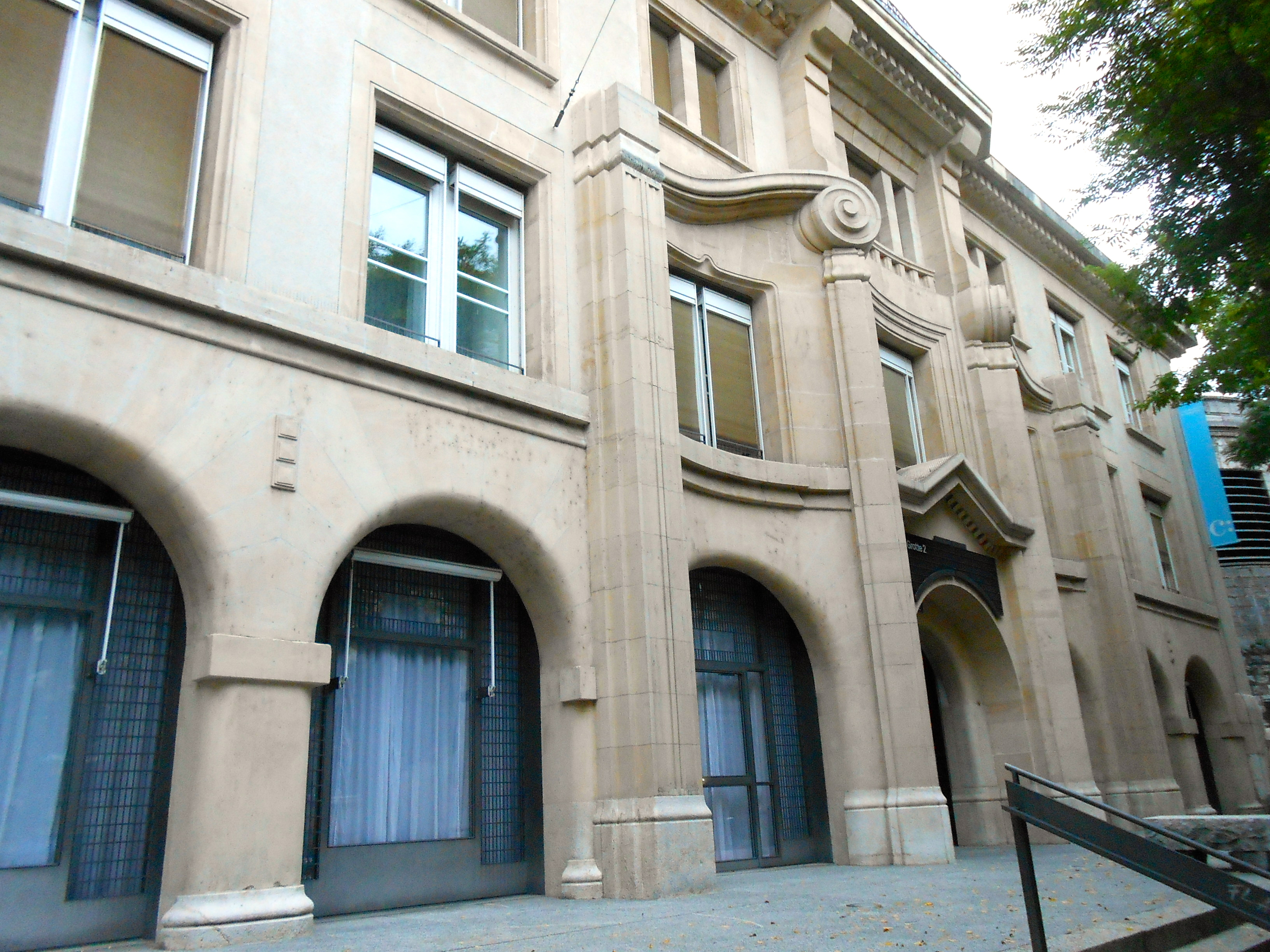
The Lausanne Conservatory, where the quartet was premiered

The dates of composition of the First String Quartet are known with unusual precision: Enescu began work on it at midnight of the (orthodox) Romanian New Year, 14 January 1916, at the Villa Copou in Iași. After interruptions resulting from the entry of Romania into the First World War, he resumed work on the quartet in 1918, only to break off again until the summer of 1920. He completed the score in Switzerland on 1 December 1920 at Le Châtelet, a house in Vers-chez-les-Blanc (Lausanne) owned by Maria Tescanu Rosetti. The work was first performed on 5 February 1921 at the Lausanne Conservatory Hall by a quartet consisting of the composer on viola, José Porta, first violin, R. Radrizzani, second violin, and Jean Décosterd, cello, in a concert devoted to Enescu's chamber music which also included the Second Piano Suite played by Clara Haskil. Subsequent performances took place at the Romanian Athenaeum in Bucharest on 21, 28, and 31 May 1921, with the composer playing first violin, Constantin C. Nottara second violin, Teodor Popovici viola, and Nicolae Ochialbi cello.

Although the published score does not bear a dedication, the quartet is said to be dedicated to the Flonzaley Quartet (Adolfo Betti, Alfred Pochon, Louis Bailly, and Iwan d'Archambeau), who gave the first Paris performance at the Salle Gaveau in Paris on 19 October 1921.)

== Analysis ==
The quartet is in four movements:

1. Allegro moderato
2. Andante pensieroso
3. Allegretto scherzando, non troppo vivace
4. Allegro moderato

This is an exceptionally long and thematically complex work, in which Enescu transmutes traditional structures, requiring repeated hearings if listeners are to keep their bearings. Because of its constantly changing lines, harmonic mobility, and textural complexity, the Quartet demands a great deal from the listener, ranking among the most difficult works of an especially difficult composer. In short, it is precisely because of the composer's wealth of invention on the levels of form, melody, rhythm, timbre, and harmony, that this work is not best suited as an introduction to Enescu's music.

The first movement is in sonata-allegro form, though Enescu’s characteristic use of evolutionary processes and transformations results in the inclusion of some developmental passages within the exposition, as well as continuous variation of the melodic material there.

The main theme is presented at the outset, over a pedal E♭ in the cello, but moves quickly on to the keys of C major and F minor, in a series of developing variations. The secondary theme, by contrast, is only unfolded gradually, starting in b. 15, building up from motivic fragments to a complete statement of the theme at rehearsal number 8, at first in the expected dominant key of B♭ major, but then turning to the dominant's relative key of G minor. A seemingly insignificant, accompanimental thematic element, which will become more important in the quartet's later movements, occurs between the two main theme groups and may be regarded either as a bridge passage, or as a part of the first group's texture.

== Discography ==
- George Enescu: Cvartet de Coarde în mi bemol major, Op. 22 No. 1. String Quartet of the Romanian Radio (Nicolae Drăgoi and Dorian Varga, violins; Alexandru Rădulescu, viola; Ion Fotino, cello). LP recording 1 disc, 33⅓ rpm, monaural. Electrecord ECE 0158. Bucharest: Electrecord, 1964.
- George Enescu: Cvartet de Coarde în mi bemol major, Op. 22 No. 1. "Voces" String Quartet. Recorded in 1980 in Romania. LP recording, 1 disc, 33⅓ rpm, stereo. Electrecord ST-ECE 01854. Bucharest: Electrecord, n.d.
  - Reissued, coupled with String Quartet No. 2, Op. 22, No. 2, in G major. CD recording, 1 audio disc: digital, stereo, 4¾ in. Olympia Explorer Series. Olympia OCD 413. London: Olympia, 1991. Reissued, Electrecord EDC 662/663. Bucharest: Electrecord, 2005.
- George Enescu: String Quartets Op. 22, Nos. 1 & 2. Quatuor Athenaeum Enesco (Constantin Bogdanas and Florin Szigeti, violíns; Dan Iarca, viola; Dorel Fodereanu, cello). Recorded 16–19 May 1992 by Schweizer Radio DRS. CD recording, 1 audio disc: digital, stereo, 4¾ in. CPO 999-0682. Georgsmarienhütte: CPO, [1993].
- Enescu: String Quartets Nos. 1 and 2. Quatuor Ad Libitum (Adrian Berescu and Șerban Mereuță, violins; Bogdan Bișoc, viola; Filip Papa, cello). Recorded in the Moldova Philharmonic Hall, Iași, May 1999. CD recording, 1 audio disc: digital, stereo, 4¾ in. Mécénat MusicalNaxos 8.554721. [S.l.]: HNH International, Ltd. 2000.
