= Orchestral Suite No. 3 (Enescu) =

Orchestral composition by George Enescu

- "Villageoise"
- Orchestral music by George Enescu
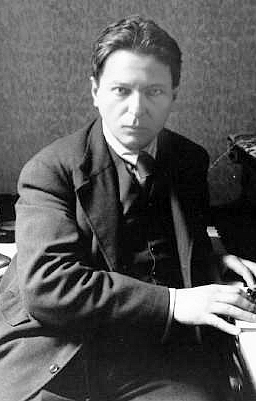
- Georges Enesco in 1930
- Key: D major
- Opus: 27
- Composed: 1937–38
- Dedication: New York Philharmonic-Symphony; Elena Bibescu (in print)
- Performed: 2 February 1939 Carnegie Hall
- Movements: 5

The Orchestral Suite No. 3 in D major, Op. 27, subtitled "Villageoise" in French ("Săteasca" in Romanian), is an orchestral composition by the Romanian composer George Enescu, written in 1937–38.

== History ==
In 1936, Enescu received a commission from the New York Philharmonic-Symphony orchestra for an orchestral composition to be premiered in January 1938. He began work in April 1937, though he incorporated into the new work sketches that had been made earlier. Although the score of the "Village" Suite was virtually completed in late 1937 or early 1938, Enescu was not yet satisfied that the score was quite yet ready, and postponed the performance. The final touches were put to the suite, according to a note in the manuscript, on 4 October 1938, at the composer's villa, Luminiș, in Sinaia. The delayed first performance took place on 2 February 1939 at Carnegie Hall in New York by the New York Philharmonic-Symphony Orchestra, conducted by the composer. Although contemporary reports at the time of the premiere said the score was also dedicated to the New York Philharmonic-Symphony, the score as published in 1965 bears a dedication to the memory of Elena Bibescu.

== Analysis ==
The suite is in five movements, each bearing a programmatic title in French:

1. "Renouveau champêtre" (Renewal [i.e., Spring] in the Country)
2. "Gamins en plein air" (Children Outdoors)
3. "La vieille maison de l’enfance, au soleil couchant; Pâtre; Oiseaux migrateurs et corbeaux; Cloches vespérales" (The Old Childhood Home at Sunset; Shepherd; Migratory Birds and Crows; Vesper Bells)
4. "Rivière sous la lune" (River beneath the Moon)
5. "Danses rustiques" (Rustic Dances)

The work follows a programme presenting a day-night-day sequence, as Enescu had done nearly forty years earlier in his Op. 1, Poème roumain, and would do again two years later in the suite Impressions d'enfance for violin and piano, Op. 28. Nevertheless, Enescu transforms his descriptive writing into the realm of absolute music in one of his most sophisticated orchestral compositions (Malcolm 1990, 205). Programme music, however, is rare in Enescu's output. Apart from the two works just mentioned, he touched on it in some of the Pièces impromptues for piano (1913–16), and programmatic elements remain concealed in the Third Symphony and the tone poem Vox maris.

There is considerable disagreement about the forms of some of the movements, as well as the larger question of whether Enescu employs cyclic procedures in this work.
