= Poème roumain =

Orchestral work by George Enescu

- Orchestral music by George Enescu
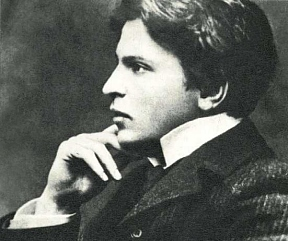
- George Enescu in the 1910s
- Opus: 1
- Composed: 1897
- Performed: 1898

Poème roumain (Romanian: Poema română, English: Romanian poem), Op. 1, is an orchestral work written by Romanian composer George Enescu in 1897. Composed when he was 16 years old, it is Enescu's first orchestral piece. It premiered in 1898.

== History ==
After studying at the Vienna Conservatory from 1888 to 1894, Enescu moved to France in 1895 to study at the Paris Conservatory. There, he studied music under his teachers Martin Marsick, Gabriel Fauré, Jules Massenet, and André Gedalge. Enescu was held in high regard by his teachers, who referred to the student as a genius. During this time, Princess Elizabeth Bibesco introduced Enescu to prominent French composers and musicians including Camille Saint-Saëns and Édouard Colonne. On June 11, 1897, the 15-year-old Enescu had an entire concert in Paris devoted to his song and chamber music works.

Later that year, while still studying at the Paris Conservatory, Enescu, by then 16, composed his first orchestral piece, titled Poème roumain. Édouard Colonne had taken an interest in the young composer after the 1897 concert and decided to conduct the premiere of the work. Thus, in January 1898, Poème roumain was premiered in Paris by Colonne and his prestigious Concerts Colonne. This performance is considered an "early triumph" in Enescu's career. In March 1899, Enescu himself conducted a performance of the work in Bucharest.

During the 2017 George Enescu Festival held in honor of Enescu, the Poème roumain was performed for the first time in the festival's history by the French orchestra Les Siècles and the Romanian Royal Choir under François-Xavier Roth at the Romanian Athenaeum.

== Music ==
Poème roumain is scored for three flutes, piccolo, two oboes, two clarinets, two bassoons, four horns, two trumpets, two cornets, three trombones, tuba, timpani, two harps, and strings. Enescu dedicated the work to Queen Elisabeth of Romania.

The piece features Roma influences, which are also prominent in Enescu's later works such as his Romanian Rhapsodies. The ending of the work also quotes the Romanian royal anthem "Trăiască Regele" (Long live the King), which led to a halt in performances on Romanian stages from 1948 to 1989 for political reasons. The piece did however feature in an eponymous television film that screened at the 1981 Enescu Festival. Noel Malcolm, who attended, described the music as "slightly tedious, with a main subject which sounds like Fingal's Cave played at 16 r.p.m.". It was performed again live in Romania in 1990, by the Enescu Philharmonic.
