= Symphony No. 1 (Enescu) =

Symphony by George Enescu

- by George Enescu
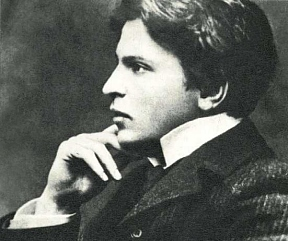
- George Enescu in the 1910s
- Key: E♭ major
- Opus: 13
- Composed: 1905
- Dedication: Alfredo Casella
- Performed: 21 January 1906 Théâtre du Châtelet, Paris
- Movements: 3

Symphony No. 1, Op. 13, in E♭ by the Romanian composer George Enescu reflects the composer's training in both Vienna and Paris. In the former location he studied the Brahmsian tradition with Robert Fuchs, and in the latter the French tradition with Jules Massenet and Gabriel Fauré.

== History ==
Enescu completed the symphony in 1905, and it was premiered on Sunday, 21 January 1906 at the Théâtre du Châtelet in Paris, on the fourteenth concert of the 1905–06 series of the Concerts Colonne, conducted by Édouard Colonne. It was published by Enoch et co., Paris, in 1906. The score is dedicated to Alfredo Casella, Enescu's former classmate at the Paris Conservatoire and lifelong friend. In turn, Casella would dedicate his Second Symphony to Enescu in 1908.

== Instrumentation ==
The symphony is scored for 3 flutes (third doubling piccolo), 2 oboes, cor anglais, E♭ clarinet, 2 clarinets, bass clarinet, 3 bassoons, contrabassoon, 4 horns, 2 trumpets, 2 cornets, 3 trombones, tuba, timpani, percussion (triangle, tambourine, cymbals, bass drum), 2 harps, 20 first violins, 18 or 20 second violins, 14 violas, 12 cellos, and 12 contrabasses.

== Analysis ==
The symphony falls into three movements:

1. Assez vif et rythmé
2. Lent
3. Vif et vigoureux

The first movement is dominated by the three component motives of the first theme, announced in unison at the beginning. It is in the traditional sonata-allegro form, with a rather short development section and the culmination in the recapitulation.

The slow movement can be regarded as an extended Lied form: ABCBCA, preceded by an introduction and concluded with a coda. However, the second half (the BCA portion) does not simply repeat the material from the first part, but develops it, and is not followed with a full recapitulation but closes rather suddenly with only the A material, and then the coda,

The exposition of the finale, also in sonata-allegro form, is similar to that of the first movement, with the main difference being that the place of a first theme is taken by a group of clearly defined thematic elements (the first, in the unison strings, forms a quasi-permanent background, followed by a second figure in the brass, a third in the trombone, and so on). The second theme is anticipated in triplets, only gradually achieving a stable profile after several attempts.

== Discography ==
- Enescu, George. Simfonia 1-a in mi bemol major, op. 13. Orchestra Simfonica a Filarmonicii de Stat "George Enescu" din București, George Georgescu, cond. Electrecord ECD 58 (LP), ca. 1960–69. Reissued on Artia ALP 118 (LP)
- Enescu, George. Symphony No. 1, Sinfonia Concertante for Cello & Orchestra, Op. 8. George Enescu State Philharmonic, Mihai Brediceanu, cond. (Symphony); Valentin Arcu, cello; Orchestra of the Romanian Radio and Television, Iosif Conta, cond. (Sinfonia Concertante). Marco Polo 8.223141 (CD). [N.p.]: Pacific Music Co., Ltd., 1988. Reissued (streaming audio) Naxos Music Library, 2004.
- Enescu, George. Orchestral Works, Volume 3. Symphony No. 1 in E-flat major, op. 13; Vox maris, op. 31. Philharmonia Moldova, Alexander Lascae, cond. With Marius Budoiu, tenor; The Gavril Musicescu Choir (Doru Morariu, choir master). Ottavo OTR C59346 (CD). The Hague: Ottavo Recordings, 1994.
- Enescu, George. Complete Orchestral Works, Vol. 1. Symphony No. 1 in E-flat major, op. 13; Romanian Overture; Study Symphony No. 4 in E-flat major. Romanian National Radio Orchestra, Horia Andreescu, cond. Electrecord [catalog number and date unknown] Reissued, Olympia Explorer Series. Olympia OCD 441 (CD). London: Olympia Compact Discs Ltd., 1994.
- Enescu, George. Symphony No. 1; Suite No. 3 'Villageoise'. BBC Philharmonic, Gennady Rozhdestvensky, cond. Chandos CHAN 9507 (CD).
- Enescu, George. Symphonies 1 et 2. Orchestre Philharmonique de Monte-Carlo, Lawrence Foster, cond. EMI Classics CDC 7 54763 2 (0777 7 54763 2) [N.p.]: EMI France, 1993.
- Enescu, George. Suite d'orchestre no. 1; Intermède op. 12; Symphony no. 1. "George Enescu" Bucharest Philharmonic Orchestra, Cristian Mandeal, conductor. Arte Nova 74321 37314 2 (CD). [Germany]: Arte Nova, 1996. Reissued Arte Nova 373140 (CD). [Germany]: Arte Nova, 2007.
- Enescu, George. Symphonie Concertante; Symphony No. 1. Tampere Philharmonic, Hannu Lintu, cond.; Truls Mork, cello. Ondine ODE1198-2 (CD). [N.p.]: Ondine Records, 2015.
