= Luminiș =

House owned by Romanian composer George Enescu

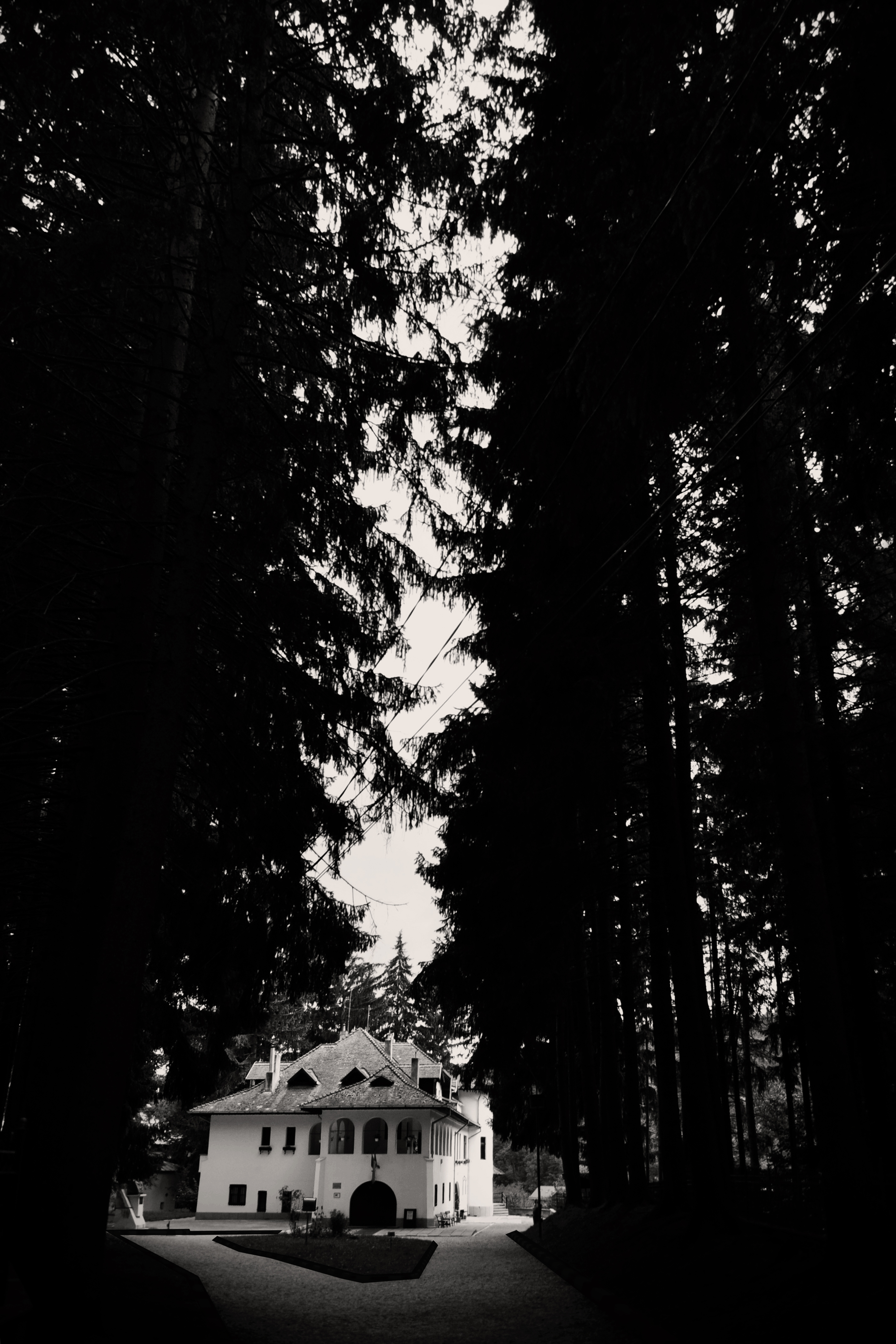

The Luminiș Villa, George Enescu Memorial House is located in the Cumpătu district, the only suburb of Sinaia, Romania. The villa is situated on the right bank of Prahova River. It was owned by the Romanian composer and musician George Enescu (1881–1955). The villa was built between 1923 and 1926 by architect Radu Dudescu, and is an example of Neo-Brâncovenesc style.

== History ==
The town of Sinaia and Luminiș Villa held a special significance for Enescu, who considered them his places of refuge. Enescu was both sentimentally and professionally connected to this town, mainly due to Queen Elisabeth's support of his musical career. Relatively isolated among the Bucegi Mountains, Luminiș Villa become his main retreat. The villa is furnished and decorated with elements from both Romanian and Asian cultures. The marble bust of Enescu, situated at the entrance into the villa, is the work of Ion Irimescu.

Enescu lived at the villa from 1926 until 1946. After permanently leaving Romania due to the political events of the post-World War II era, Enescu signed a document in Paris donating his Luminiș Villa as a cultural house, conceived as a rest and recuperation shelter for Romanian and foreign artists. In 1990, Luminiș Villa underwent renovations, as part of a 5-year restoration and conservation project for cultural buildings put forth by the Ministry of Culture and by the European Culture Centre of Sinaia.

On September 5, 1995, during the George Enescu Festival, Luminiș Villa officially became a memorial site.

In 2025, a storm in the area caused two trees to fall on the villa's roof, requiring restoration.
