= George Enescu =

Romanian composer and violinist (1881–1955)

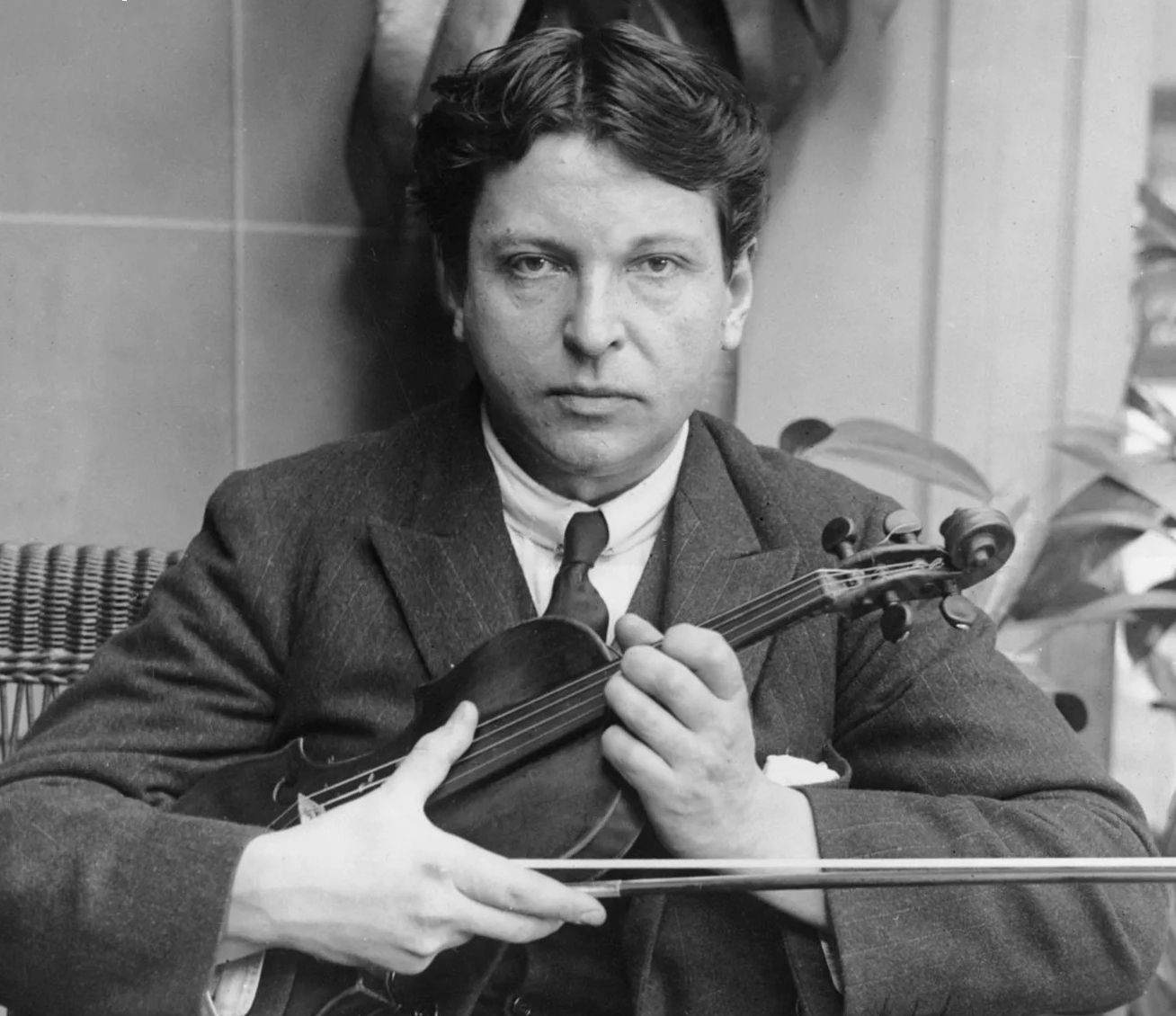
- Born: 19 August 1881; Liveni-Vârnav, Kingdom of Romania
- Died: 4 May 1955 (aged 73); Paris, France
- Burial place: Père Lachaise Cemetery, Paris
- Citizenship: Romania, France
- Occupations: musician, composer
- Notable work: Romanian Rhapsodies
- Spouse: Maria Tescanu Rosetti (m. 1939; div. 1955)
- Children: 1

Member of the Senate of Romania
- In office 1939–1940

Member of the Chamber of Deputies (Romania)
- In office 1946–1948
- Constituency: Dorohoi County

Personal details
- Party: National Renaissance Front (1939–1940); Bloc of Democratic Parties (1946–1948)
- Parents: Costache Enescu (father); Maria Enescu (mother)

George Enescu (Romanian: [ˈdʒe̯ordʒe eˈnesku]; 19 August [O.S. 7 August] 1881 – 4 May 1955), known in France as Georges Enesco, was a Romanian composer, violinist, pianist, conductor, and teacher. He is regarded as one of the greatest musicians in Romanian history.

== Biography ==
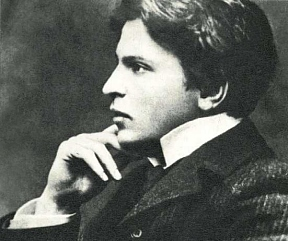
Young George Enescu

Enescu was born in Romania, in the village of Liveni (later renamed "George Enescu" in his honor), then in Dorohoi County, today Botoșani County. His father was Costache Enescu, a landholder, and his mother was Maria Enescu (née Cosmovici), the daughter of an Orthodox priest. Their eighth child, he was born after all the previous siblings had died in infancy. His father later separated from Maria Enescu and had another son with Maria Ferdinand-Suschi: the painter Dumitru Bâșcu.

A child prodigy, Enescu began experimenting with composing at an early age. Several, mostly very short, pieces survive, all for violin and piano. The earliest work of significant length bears the title Pămînt românesc ("Romanian Land"), and is inscribed "opus for piano and violin by George Enescu, Romanian composer, aged five years and a quarter". Shortly thereafter, his father presented him to the professor and composer Eduard Caudella. On 5 October 1888, at the age of seven, he became the youngest student ever admitted to the Vienna Conservatory, where he studied with Joseph Hellmesberger Jr., Robert Fuchs, and Sigismund Bachrich. He was the second person ever to be admitted to the Vienna Conservatory by a dispensation of age, and was the first non-Austrian (in 1882, Fritz Kreisler had also been admitted at the age of seven; according to the rules, nobody younger than 14 years could study there).

In 1891, the ten-year-old Enescu gave a private concert at the Court of Vienna, in the presence of Emperor Franz Joseph I of Austria.

Joseph Hellmesberger Sr., one of his teachers and the director of the Vienna Conservatory, hosted Enescu at his home, where the child prodigy met his idol, Johannes Brahms.

External audio
- Enescu playing J. S. Bach's Concerto for Two Violins in D minor, BWV 1043 with Yehudi Menuhin and Pierre Monteux conducting the Orchestre symphonique de Paris in 1932

He graduated at the age of 12, earning the silver medal. In his Viennese concerts young Enescu played works by Brahms, Sarasate and Mendelssohn. In 1895, he went to Paris to continue his studies. He studied violin with Martin Pierre Marsick, harmony with André Gedalge, and composition with Jules Massenet and Gabriel Fauré.

Enescu then studied from 1895 to 1899 at the Conservatoire de Paris. In a letter from André Gédalge to Lucien Rebatet, dated 16 October 1923, Gédalge said that Enescu was "the only one [among his students] who truly had ideas and spirit" (fr: le seul qui ait vraiment des idées et du souffle).

On 6 February 1898, at the age of 16, Enescu presented in Paris his first mature work, Poema Română, played by the Colonne Orchestra, then one of the most prestigious in the world, and conducted by Édouard Colonne.

Many of Enescu's works were influenced by Romanian folk music, his most popular compositions being the two Romanian Rhapsodies (1901–02), the opera Œdipe (1936), and the suites for orchestra. He also wrote five mature symphonies (two of them unfinished), a symphonic poem Vox maris, and much chamber music (three sonatas for violin and piano, two for cello and piano, a piano trio, two string quartets and two piano quartets, a wind decet (French, "dixtuor"), an octet for strings, a piano quintet, and a chamber symphony for twelve solo instruments). A young Ravi Shankar recalled in the 1960s how Enescu, who had developed a deep interest in Oriental music, rehearsed with Shankar's brother Uday Shankar and his musicians. Around the same time, Enescu took the young Yehudi Menuhin to the Colonial Exhibition in Paris, where he introduced him to the Gamelan Orchestra from Indonesia.

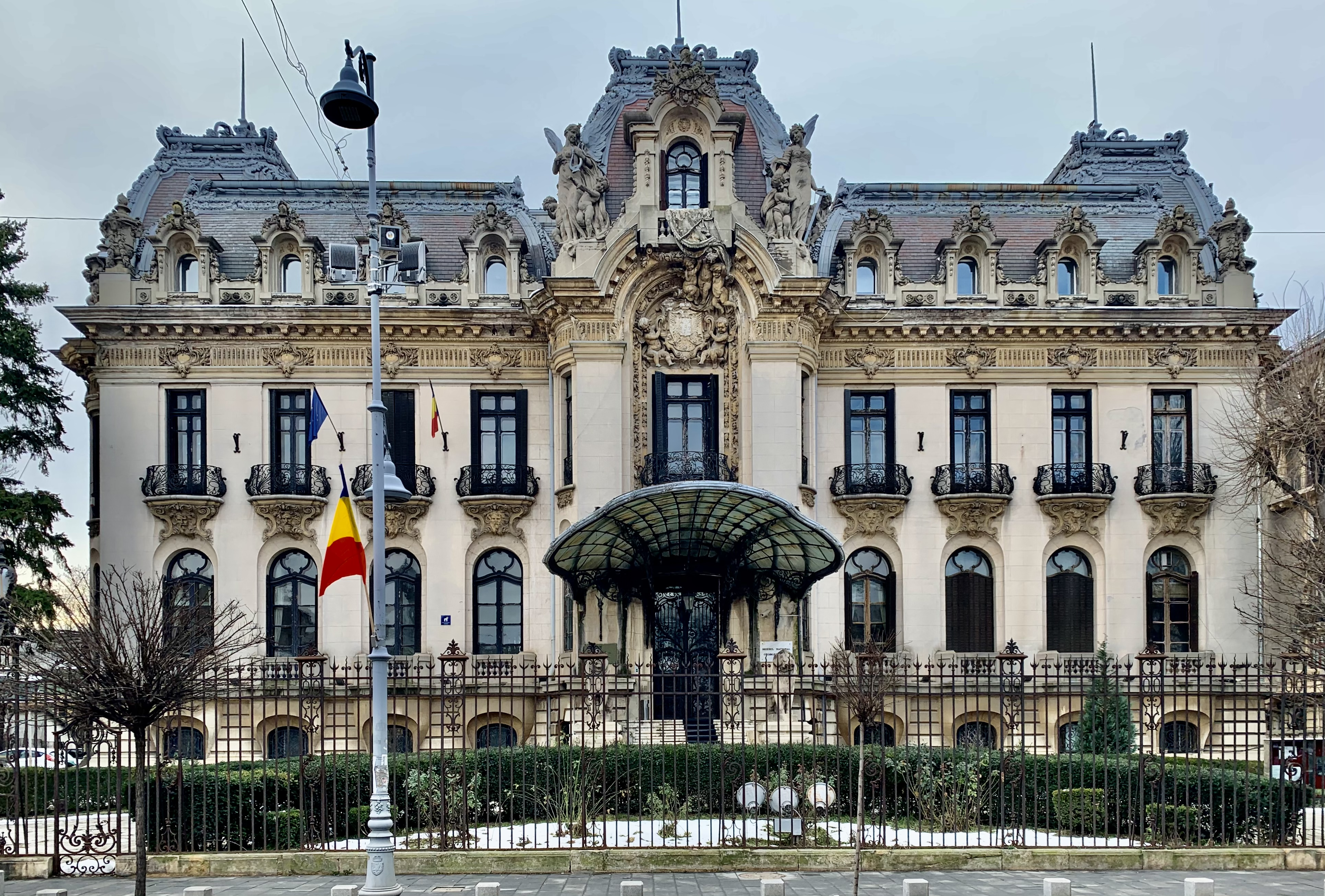
The Cantacuzino Palace on Calea Victoriei (Bucharest, Romania), built in the Beaux-Arts style, which is now the George Enescu Museum

On 8 January 1923 he made his American debut as a conductor in a concert given by the Philadelphia Orchestra at Carnegie Hall in New York City, and subsequently visited the United States many times. It was in America, in the 1920s, that Enescu was first persuaded to make recordings as a violinist. He also appeared as a conductor with many American orchestras and, in 1936, was one of the candidates considered to replace Arturo Toscanini as permanent conductor of the New York Philharmonic. In 1932, Enescu was elected a titular member of the Romanian Academy. In 1935, he conducted the Orchestre symphonique de Paris and Yehudi Menuhin (who had been his pupil for several years starting in 1927) in Mozart's Violin Concerto No. 3 in G major. He also conducted the New York Philharmonic between 1937 and 1938. In 1939, he married Maria Tescanu Rosetti (known as Princess Maruca Cantacuzino through her first husband Mihail Cantacuzino), a good friend of Queen Marie of Romania. After the 1939 Romanian general election, Enescu became a member of the Romanian Senate, being personally appointed by the King Carol II of Romania.

He was also renowned as a violin teacher. He began teaching at the Mannes School of Music in 1948. His students included Yehudi Menuhin, Christian Ferras, Ivry Gitlis, Arthur Grumiaux, Serge Blanc, Ida Haendel, Uto Ughi, and Joan Field. (See: List of music students by teacher: C to F#George Enescu.)

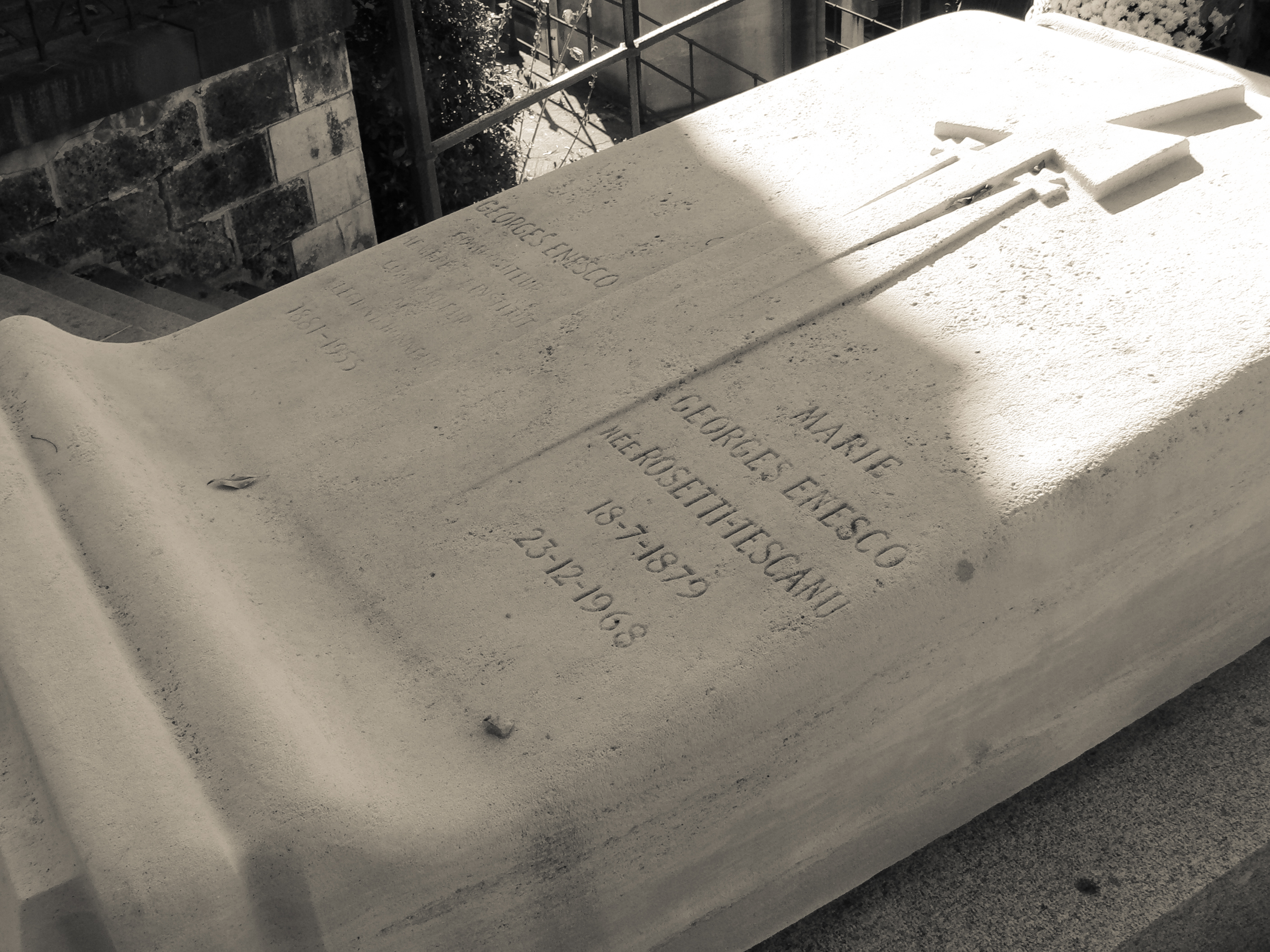
Grave of George Enescu, Père Lachaise Cemetery

He promoted contemporary Romanian music, playing works of Constantin Silvestri, Mihail Jora, Ionel Perlea and Marțian Negrea. Enescu considered Bach's Sonatas and Partitas for solo violin as the "Himalayas of violinists". An annotated version of this work brings together the indications of Enescu regarding sonority, phrasing, tempos, musicality, fingering and expression.

Enescu died on 4 May 1955. On his death, he was interred in Père Lachaise Cemetery, (48°51′43.8″N 2°23′30.8″E) in Paris.

== Reception ==
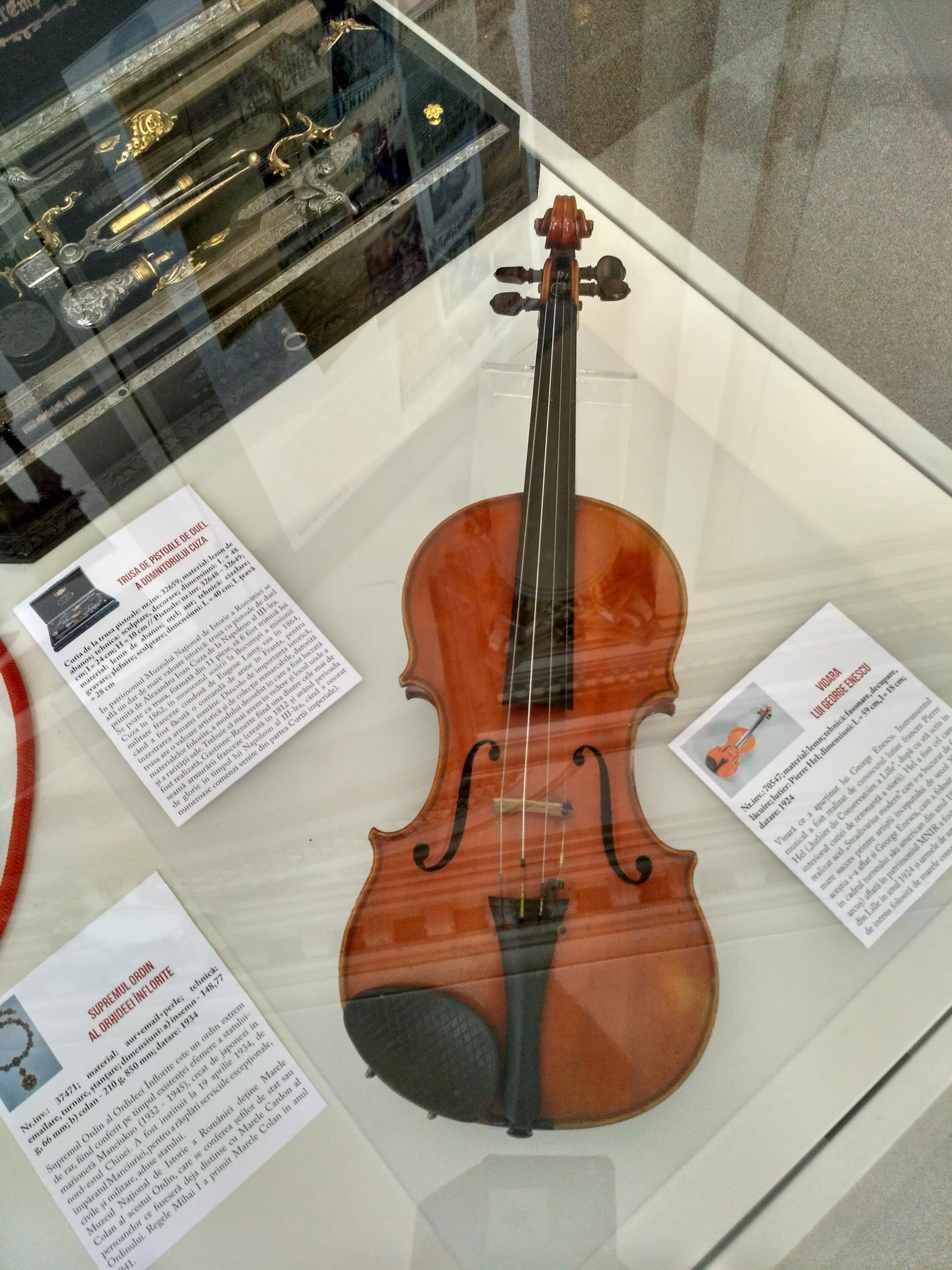
A violin owned by George Enescu in a museum in Bucharest, Romania

Pablo Casals described Enescu as "the greatest musical phenomenon since Mozart" and "one of the greatest geniuses of modern music". Queen Marie of Romania wrote in her memoirs that "in George Enescu was real gold". Yehudi Menuhin, Enescu's most famous pupil, once said about his teacher: "He will remain for me the absoluteness through which I judge others", and "Enescu gave me the light that has guided my entire existence." He also considered Enescu "the most extraordinary human being, the greatest musician and the most formative influence" he had ever experienced. Vincent d'Indy claimed that if Beethoven's works were destroyed, they could be all reconstructed from memory by George Enescu. Alfred Cortot, one of the greatest pianists of all time, once said that Enescu, though primarily a violinist, had better piano technique than his own.

Enescu's only opera, Œdipe (Oedipe), was staged for the first time at the Royal Opera House in London in 2016, 80 years after its Paris premiere, in a production directed and designed by La Fura dels Baus which received superlative reviews in The Guardian, The Independent, The Times and other publications. An analysis of Enescu's work and the reasons why it is little known in the UK was published by musician Dominic Saunders in The Guardian.

== Commemorations ==
Enescu founded the Enescu Prize in composition, which was awarded from 1913 to 1946, and afterwards by the National University of Music Bucharest.

Eugène Ysaÿe's Violin Sonata No. 3 in D minor, subtitled "Ballade" (composed in 1923), was dedicated as an act of homage to fellow-violinist Enescu.

While staying in Bucharest during the 1930s, Enescu lived in the Cantacuzino Palace on Calea Victoriei and married its then owner, Maruca Cantacuzino, in 1939. After the Communist takeover, the couple occupied a part of it briefly before moving to Paris in 1947. Following Enescu's death in 1955, Maruca donated the palace to the Romanian state in order to organize a museum in memory of the musician. Likewise, the Symphony Orchestra of Bucharest and the George Enescu Festival—initiated by the musicologist Andrei Tudor and supported by his friend, musical advocate, and sometime collaborator, the conductor George Georgescu—are named and held in his honor, and the composer's childhood home in Liveni was inaugurated as a memorial museum in 1958.

Earlier still, in 1947, his wife Maruca donated to the state the mansion near Moinești where Enescu had lived and where he completed his opera Oedipe, provided that a cultural centre be built there. In Moinești itself there is a street named after the composer, as well as a middle school. In addition the renamed George Enescu International Airport at Bacău is some twenty miles away. Then in 2014 the home of Enescu's maternal grandfather in Mihăileni, Botoșani, where the composer spent part of his childhood, was rescued from an advanced state of dilapidation by a team of volunteer architects and now houses a centre of excellence for the study of music.

Enescu's portrait appeared on the redesigned 5 lei Romanian banknote in 2005.

== Selected works ==
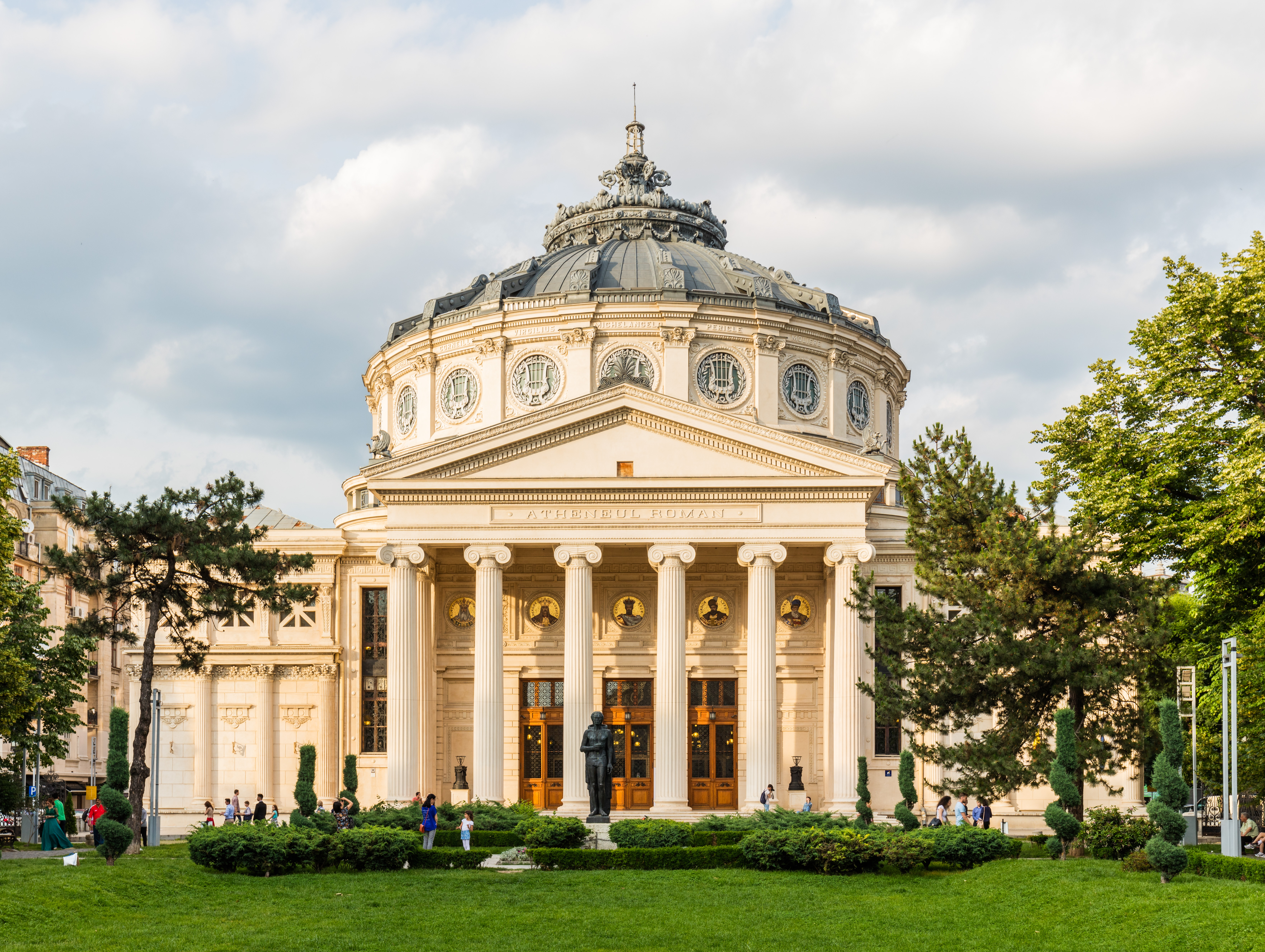
Filarmonica "George Enescu" – Romanian Athenaeum, Bucharest External audio: Recording of Enescu's Romanian Rhapsodies No. 1 and No. 2, Op. 11

=== Operas ===
- Œdipe, tragédie lyrique in four acts, libretto by Edmond Fleg, Op. 23 (1910–31)

=== Symphonies ===
- Symphony No. 1 in E♭ major, Op. 13 (1905)
- Symphony No. 2 in A major, Op. 17 (1912–14)
- Symphony No. 3 in C major, with chorus, Op. 21 (1916–18)
- Symphony No. 4 in E minor (1935; completed by Pascal Bentoiu in 1996)
- Symphony No. 5 in D major, with women's chorus and tenor solo (1941; first partially completed by Cornel Țăranu in 1970–72 and 1990, then completed by Pascal Bentoiu in 1995)

=== Other orchestral works ===
- Poème roumain, symphonic suite for orchestra, Op. 1 (1897)
- Romanian Rhapsody No. 1 in A major, Op. 11 (1901)
- Romanian Rhapsody No. 2 in D major, Op. 11 (1901)
- Symphonia concertante in B minor, Op. 8 (1901)
- Orchestral Suite No. 1 in C major, Op. 9 (1903)
- Orchestral Suite No. 2 in C major, Op. 20 (1915)
- Orchestral Suite No. 3 in D major Suite Villageoise, Op. 27 (1937–38)
- Overture on Popular Romanian Themes, Op. 32

=== Chamber works ===
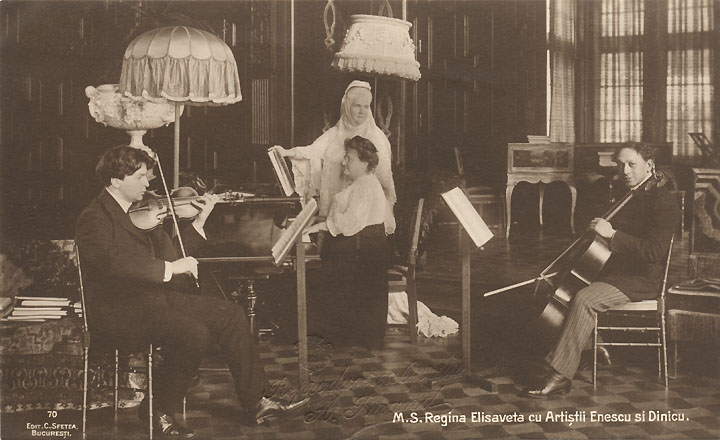
Queen Elisabeth of Romania with George Enescu and Dimitrie Dinicu at Peleș Castle

==== String quartets ====
- String Quartet No. 1 in E♭ major, Op. 22, No. 1 (1916–20)
- String Quartet No. 2 in G major, Op. 22, No. 2 (1930–32)

==== Sonatas ====
- Violin Sonata No. 1 in D major, Op. 2 (1897)
- Violin Sonata No. 2 in F minor, Op. 6 (1899)
- Violin Sonata No. 3 in A minor dans le caractère populaire roumain, Op. 25 (1926)
- Cello Sonata No. 1 in F minor, Op. 26, No. 1 (1898)
- Cello Sonata No. 2 in C major, Op. 26, No. 2 (1935)

==== Other chamber works ====
Cantabile and Presto
Performed by Albert Tipton (flute) and Mary Norris (piano)

Cantabile and Presto
Performed by Alex Murray (flute) and Martha Goldstein (piano)

- Octet for Strings in C major, Op. 7 (1900)
- Cantabile et Presto, for flute and piano (1904)
- Decet in D major, for wind instruments, Op. 14 (1906)
- Concertstück, for viola and piano (1906)
- Légende, for trumpet and piano (1906)
- Piano Quartet No. 1 in D major, Op. 16 (1909)
- Impressions d'enfance in D major, for violin and piano, Op. 28 (1940)
- Piano Quintet in A minor, Op. 29 (1940)
- Piano Quartet No. 2 in D minor, Op. 30 (1943–44)
- Chamber Symphony, for 12 instruments, Op. 33 (1954)

=== Piano music ===
- Piano Suite No. 1 in G minor, Dans le style ancien, Op. 3 (1897)
- Piano Suite No. 2 in D major, Op. 10 (1901/1903)
- Piano Suite No. 3, Pieces impromptues Op. 18 (1913–16)
- Piano Sonata No. 1 in F♯ minor, op 24, No. 1 (1924)
- Piano Sonata No. 3 in D major, op 24, No. 3 (1933–35)
- Piano arrangement of Romanian Rhapsody No. 1 in A major, Op. 11 (1951)

=== Songs ===
- Three songs setting Lemaitre and Prudhomme
- Four songs setting Fernand Gregh
- In German: various settings of Carmen Silva (Queen Elisabeth of Romania)
- In Romanian – 3 songs:
  - Trois Mélodies, Op. 4 (1898)
  - Sept Chansons de Clement Marot, for tenor and piano, Op. 15 (1907–08)
  - Trois Mélodies, Op. 19 (1916)

== See also ==
- Category:Compositions by George Enescu
- George Enescu Philharmonic Orchestra
- George Enescu International Competition
- List of 20th-century classical composers
