= Chamber Symphony (Enescu) =

Musical composition by George Enescu

- by George Enescu
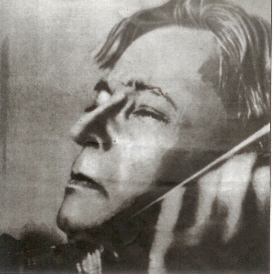
- George Enescu
- Key: E major
- Opus: 33
- Composed: 1954
- Dedication: Association of Chamber Music Concerts of Paris; Fernand Oubradous
- Performed: 1955 Romanian Athenaeum, Bucharest
- Movements: 4
- Scoring: 7 winds; 4 strings; piano

The Chamber Symphony, Op. 33, in E major, is a symphony written for twelve instruments, and the last work finished by the Romanian composer George Enescu.

== History ==
The earliest ideas eventually taken up in the Chamber Symphony date back to a sketch for a septet for winds and piano, dating from around the time of the Octet for strings, Op. 7 (1900). The score is dated May 1954, a year before his death but less than two months before Enescu suffered the cerebral stroke in July that made all work impossible. The final markings to the score had to be dictated to Marcel Mihalovici. The score is dedicated to the Association of Chamber Music Concerts of Paris and its permanent conductor Fernand Oubradous.

The work was performed for the first time in a concert commemorating the first anniversary of the composer's death, at the Romanian Athenaeum in Bucharest. Constantin Silvestri conducted the performance and, when it received only a tepid response from the audience, announced, "This work is Enescu's masterpiece; it is more difficult to grasp than others, because of its very advanced language. Therefore, we shall perform it once more in its entirety." After this second hearing, it was a great success .

The work 'waited' for 57 years to be performed in the UK. The UK Première took place on 19 September 2011 in Kings Place, London. It was performed by the London Schubert Players chamber orchestra and conducted by Hu Kun with Enescu's own baton (Chinese violinist Hu Kun had been Yehudi Menuhin’s protégé and his one and only private student). The event was produced by pianist Anda Anastasescu who also took part in the performance of the work. The concert, entitled 'ENESCU'S FAREWELL', was part of London Schubert Players' international project 'Invitation to Composers' for the European Commission, 2009-2011. This live performance is featured on Nimbus Alliance 3CD set 'A European Odyssey' and on Anda Anastasescu’s YouTube channel: https://www.youtube.com/channel/UCPLgIBlRgbpwf6CM6n2C4gw/video. The project was the brainchild of Anda Anastasescu Gritten - pianist and artistic director of the London Schubert Players. Seven composers from Romania, UK, Norway, Sweden, France and Italy took up the challenge of writing works inspired by Enescu's 'Chamber Symphony' and for the same combination of instruments. The World Premières of the new works were performed in London's King's Place and in the Royal Academy of Music on 19 September and 23 October 2011.

== Instrumentation ==
The work is scored for twelve instruments: flute, oboe, cor anglais, clarinet, bassoon, horn, trumpet, violin, viola, cello, doublebass, and piano.

== Analysis ==
The Chamber Symphony transcends the cyclical principles of Enescu's earlier works, in that the entire composition is constructed as a single sonata-allegro overarching entity, cast in four movements:

1. Molto moderato, un poco maestoso: a double exposition, leading to the combined thematic synthesis that will be developed in the following movements
2. Allegretto molto moderato: a combined scherzo and theme and variations
3. Adagio: unites the materials worked out in the previous movement into a vast melodic line
4. Allegro molto moderato: a first section continues working out the thematic synthesis, and a second provides the recapitulation of the first-movement material.
