= Légende (Enescu) =

Work for trumpet and piano by George Enescu

- by George Enescu
- Genre: Chamber music
- Instrumental: Trumpet, piano

Légende (1906) is a work for trumpet and piano, composed by George Enescu for the 1906 trumpet competition (concours) at the Paris Conservatory and premiered in the competition by students from the trumpet class of Professor Merri Franquin, to whom the work is dedicated. The fact that Enescu found it unnecessary to specify "chromatic trumpet" or "trumpet in C" in the work's title (which might have been normal just a few years earlier) may be seen as a testament to Franquin's influence in adopting of the modern, small trumpet (Shamu 2009, 1, 129–31).

A simple listing of the performance indications which follow each other in the score indicates the constantly evolving character of the music: doux, grave, hésitante, pathétique, gracieux, mouvement agité, chantant, vif, furieusement, rêveur (Hoffmann and Raţiu 1971, 328).

== Sources ==
- Shamu, Geoffrey. 2009. "Merri Franquin and His Contribution to the Art of Trumpet Playing". DMA dissertation. Boston: Boston University. ISBN 978-1-109-00171-6.
- Hoffmann, Alfred, and Adrian Raţiu. 1971. "Afirmarea". In George Enescu: Monografie. 2 vols., edited by Mircea Voicana, 1:239–455. Bucharest: Editura Academiei Republicii Socialiste România.
