= Violin Sonata No. 2 (Enescu) =

- Chamber music by George Enescu
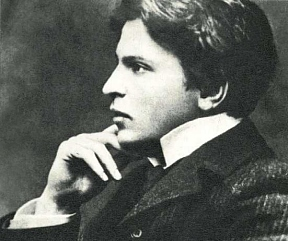
- Enescu in the 1910s
- Key: F minor
- Opus: 6
- Composed: 1899
- Dedication: Joseph and Jacques Thibaud
- Performed: 22 February 1900 Paris
- Movements: 3
- Scoring: violin; piano

The Sonata No. 2 for violin and piano in F minor, Op. 6, is the second violin sonata by the Romanian composer George Enescu, completed in 1899.

== History ==
After six years of study in Vienna, where he acquired German discipline and experienced the grandiose cultural summit of the late romantic era, Enescu moved to Paris, where he continued his studies for another five years at the Conservatoire de Paris. His contact with the modernity of the French musical world gave him certainty, clarity of thought, measure, elegance in expression and sound color for refined detail, which he learned to blend with what he had learned in Vienna, together with a stream of freshness and optimism, love of life and people, which he had brought with him from his childhood home in Moldavia.

The end of his musical apprenticeship was marked by the composition of his Second Violin Sonata in Paris in 1899 The first performance of the sonata was given in Paris by Jacques Thibaud, violin, with the composer himself at the piano, on 22 February 1900, in a concert that was part of the Concerts Colonne series The score is dedicated to Joseph and Jacques Thibaud.

Enescu later acknowledged that this sonata, together with his next work, the Octet for Strings, marked the point where "I felt myself evolving rapidly, I was becoming myself . . . Until then, I was fumbling. From that moment I felt able to walk on my own legs, even if not yet to run very fast ...".

== Analysis ==
The Sonata is in three movements:

1. Assez mouvementé
2. Tranquillement
3. Vif

The construction of each of the three movements is clear, though not entirely according to a textbook observance of the classical models. After the development section proper of the first movement’s sonata form, there is further development of the main theme, constituting a climax, full of dramatic tension.

The slow movement is a ternary form with particularities caused by cyclical returns of musical ideas from the first movement. Unusually, this movement is written in the same key (F minor), as the first movement of the Sonata, which contributes to a blurring of contrasts in favour of a principle of slow and organic transformation of the musical substance.

The finale is a rondo with a certain amount of freedom. It is prepared for at the end of the slow movement, which it follows without interruption. Perhaps as compensation for the lack of tonal contrast between the first two movements, the refrain theme begins in D minor, modulating to settle in C major. It is only in its final statement that the tonic of F is confirmed, but this time in major.

== Discography ==
The composer himself, as violinist, recorded the sonata on two occasions.

- George Enescu: Sonata nr. 2 pentru vioară si pian in fa minor op. 6. George Enescu (violin), Dinu Lipatti (piano). Recorded at the Romanian Radio, 1943. LP recording, 1 disc: 10 in., 33⅓. Electrecord ECD 61. Bucharest: Electrecord, [1950s?]. Various reissues: Electrecord ECE 0766/67 (LP), Monitor MC 2049 (LP), Everest 3413 (LP), Disque Déesse DDLX 40-1 (LP, 1972), Electrecord EDC 430/431 (CD, 2001), Philips Legendary Classics 426 100-2 (CD), Dante HPC 091-92 (CD).
- George Enescu (violin), Céliny Chailley-Richez (piano). LP recording, 1 disc. Remington R 149-42. 1951. Reissued Varèse-Sarabande VC 81048 (LP), Concerteum C-234 (LP), Forgotten Records FR 942 (CD, 2010).
