= Eduard Caudella =

Romanian opera composer

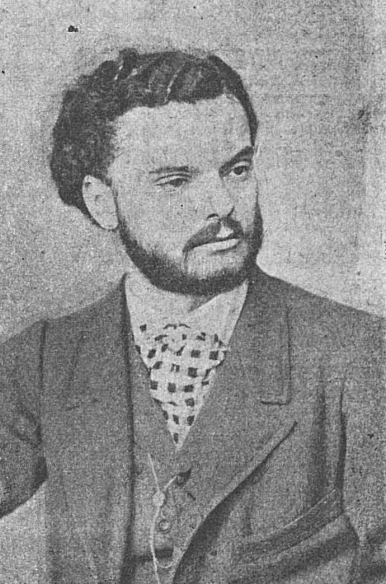
- Born: May 22, 1841; Iași, Moldavia
- Died: April 15, 1924 (aged 82); Iași, Romania

Eduard Caudella (22 May (or 3 June) 1841 – 15 April 1924) was a Romanian opera composer, also a violin virtuoso, conductor, teacher and critic. He studied with Henri Vieuxtemps, and taught at the Iași Conservatory.

== Operas ==
- Harţă Răzeşul (1872)
- Hatmanul Baltag (1884)
- Beizadea Epaminonda (1885)
- Fata răzeşului (1885)
- Petru Rareş (1889)

== Selected other works ==
- Violin Concerto No. 1 (1915)
- Dochia, orchestral ballad
- Souvenirs of the Carpathians (Amintiri din Carpati)
