= Impressions d'enfance =

Suite for violin and piano by George Enescu

- Chamber music by George Enescu
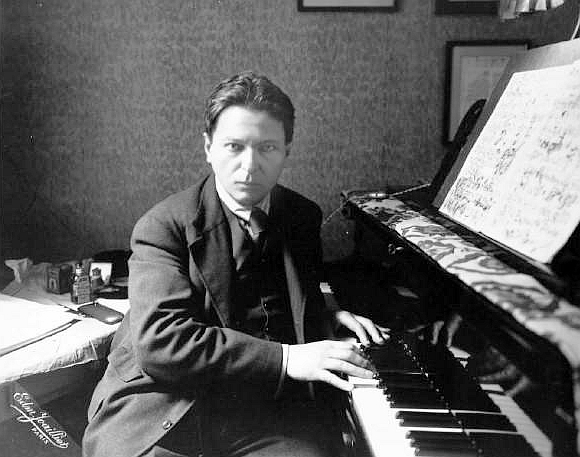
- George Enescu in 1930
- Opus: 28
- Form: Suite
- Composed: 1940
- Dedication: Eduard Caudella
- Performed: 22 February 1942 Bucharest
- Movements: 10
- Scoring: violin; piano

The Impressions d'enfance (Childhood Impressions), Op. 28, is a suite for violin and piano written by George Enescu and completed on 10 April 1940. The score is dedicated to the memory of Eduard Caudella, the composer's first violin teacher.

== History and music ==
Enescu's works for violin and piano with opus numbers are limited to three Sonatas and this suite, which came last. The chronology of the pieces covers the course of a day (day, night, and the following morning). The music is strongly influenced by Romanian folklore.

The first performance took place in Bucharest on 22 February 1942 with the composer on violin and Dinu Lipatti on piano. The same performers recorded it in 1943 for the Romanian Radio, but the 78 rpm masters appear to have been lost.

The suite is composed of 10 pieces, a performance lasting around 20 minutes.

1. "Ménétrier" (The Country Fiddler)
2. "Vieux mendiant" (The Old beggar)
3. "Ruisselet au fond du jardin" (The Brook at the bottom of the garden)
4. "L'Oiseau en cage et le coucou au mur" (The Bird in the Cage and the Cuckoo on the Wall)
5. "Chanson pour bercer" (Lullaby)
6. "Grillon" (The Cricket)
7. "Lune à travers les vitres" (The Moon Shining through the Windows)
8. "Vent dans la cheminée" (Wind in the Chimney)
9. "Tempête au dehors, dans la nuit" (Storm Outside in the night)
10. "Lever de soleil" (Sunrise)

There are pauses only between nos. 1 and 2, and between nos. 3 and 4. All the other movements are connected.

The score is published by Durand-Salabert-Eschig.
