= Piano Suite No. 2 (Enescu) =

Piano suite by George Enescu

Suite No. 2
- "Des cloches sonores"
- Piano music by George Enescu
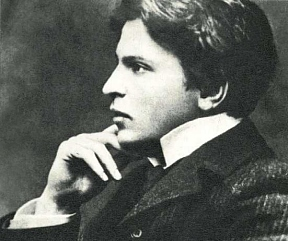
- George Enescu in the 1910s
- Key: D major
- Opus: 10
- Composed: 1901–03
- Dedication: Louis Diémer
- Published: 1904
- Duration: 20 minutes
- Movements: 4

The Suite No. 2 for piano, in D major, Op. 10 ("Des cloches sonores"), is the second piano suite by George Enescu, composed between 1901 and 1903 in Paris. It was published in 1904, and is dedicated to Louis Diémer.

The toccata was written in August 1901 and the suite was completed in the summer of 1903 with three other movements, for presentation at a competition organised by the periodical Musica. It was entered in the piano division of the competition, the Pleyel Prize, under the motto "Des cloches sonores". It won first place. The judges included Claude Debussy, Vincent d'Indy, Georges Hüe, Pierre Lalo, Charles Malherbe, Reynaldo Hahn, Henri de Curzon, Gabriel Pierné, and Alfred Cortot. It is a composition that shows a French-style neoclassicism, the musician himself recognizing the influence of Debussy, but Enescu's Romanian folklore is not absent, rather, unobtrusive.

Divided into four movements, a performance requires about twenty minutes.

1. Toccata
2. Sarabande
3. Pavane
4. Bourrée

The First UK performance was given by pianist Anda Anastasescu in the Wigmore Hall, London, on 30 December 2005, 101 years after the work’s publication. The piano recital was preceded by an interview with the artiste on BBC Radio 4’s ‘Woman’s Hour’ with Martha Kearney; and an Enescu-Silvestri exhibition created by John and Ben Gritten, was on display in the Wigmore Hall.
