= Œdipe (opera) =

Opera by George Enescu

- Opera by George Enescu
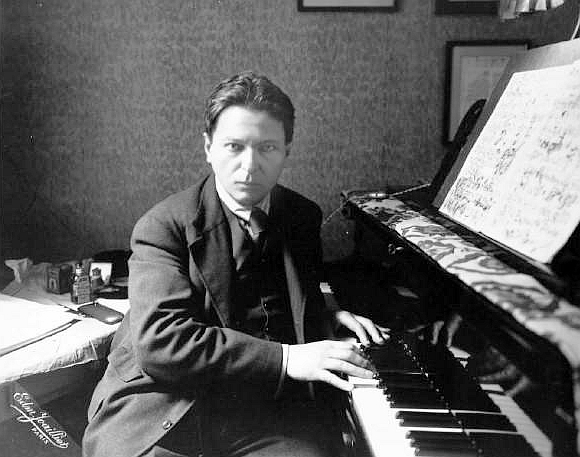
- The composer in 1930
- Librettist: Edmond Fleg
- Language: French
- Based on: The Theban plays by Sophocles
- Premiere: 13 March 1936; Paris

Œdipe (Oedipe) is an opera in four acts by the Romanian composer George Enescu, set to a French libretto by Edmond Fleg. It is based on the mythological tale of Oedipus, as told by Sophocles in Oedipus the King.

Enescu had the idea to compose an Oedipus-inspired opera even before finding a libretto and began to sketch music for it in 1910. The first-draft libretto from Fleg arrived in 1913. Enescu completed the music in 1922 and the orchestration in 1931. The opera received its world premiere in Paris on 13 March 1936. The first Romanian production was conducted by Constantin Silvestri in Bucharest on 22 September 1958, using a Romanian translation of the libretto by Emanoil Ciomac. The first German production was in Berlin in 1996, in a production that subsequently traveled to the Vienna State Opera. The United States premiere was in 2005 at the University of Illinois at Urbana-Champaign. The first performance at the Salzburg Festival took place during the summer of 2019 with Christopher Maltman in the title role, with the Vienna Philharmonic Orchestra conducted by Ingo Metzmacher, with John Tomlinson as Tiresias and Anaïk Morel as Jocaste.

This dramatic musical treatment of the Oedipus myth is unusual in that it attempts to cover the entire story of Oedipus' life, from birth to death. Act III covers the story of Oedipus Rex. Act IV overlaps in plot with Oedipus at Colonus, though with divergent psychological treatment of Oedipus' final days compared to the original. It is generally considered to be Enescu's masterpiece.

== Roles ==
Role	Voice type	Premiere cast, 13 March 1936 Conductor: Philippe Gaubert
Antigone	soprano	Jacqueline Courtin
Creon	baritone	Pierre Froumenty
Jocaste (Jocasta)	mezzo-soprano	Marisa Ferrer
The Sphinx	mezzo-soprano	Jeanne Montfort
Laïos (Laius)	tenor	Edmond Chastenet
Shepherd	tenor	José De Trevi
High priest	bass	Armand Narçon
Old man	bass	
Mérope	contralto	Marie-Antoinette Almona
Œdipe (Oedipus)	baritone	André Pernet
Thésée (Theseus)	baritone	Charles Cambon
Phorbas	bass	Jean Claverie
Tirésias	bass-baritone	Henri Etcheverry
le Veilleur		Medus
Chorus - Thebans

== Synopsis ==
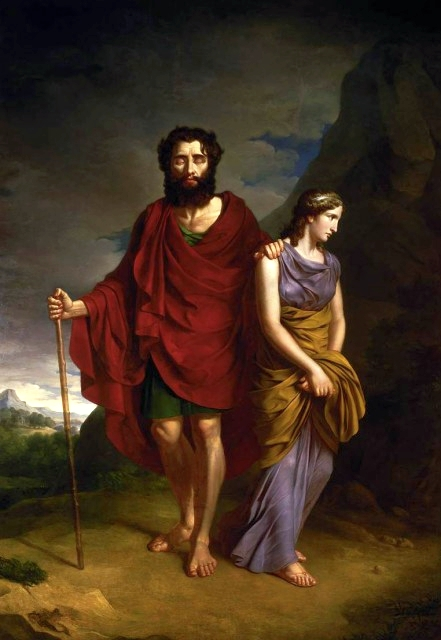
Oedipus and Antigone, by Antoni Brodowski (1828)

=== Act I ===
In the royal palace of Thebes, the people celebrate the birth of the son of King Laius and Queen Jocasta. Just as Laius and Jocasta, at the High Priest's request, are to name the child, the old and blind prophet Tiresias interrupts the festivities. He reproaches Laius for having disobeyed Apollo's injunction to bear no descendants, and tells of the gods' punishment for this transgression: one day, the child will murder his father and marry his mother. The appalled Laius summons a shepherd and commands him to abandon the infant in the mountains so that it will die.

=== Act II ===
Scene One: It is twenty years later, and the child has survived and been named Oedipus, and lives in Corinth as the child of King Polybus and Queen Merope. At the palace, Oedipus has dark visions, and declines to participate in the city games and revelry. He has visited the Oracle at Delphi, which told him his fate, that he will kill his father and marry his mother. He thinks that Polybus and Merope are his biological parents, and thus wants to flee the palace to confound the prophecy. Merope sends her counselor, Phorbes, to Oedipus, who will not reveal the cause of his concern. He does say that he was once called a foundling. More intent on leaving Corinth, Oedipus reveals the Delphic prophecy to Merope, who is aghast. Alone, Oedipus leaves Corinth.

Scene Two: At a crossroads, the shepherd who apparently spared Oedipus from death tends his herd under a storm. Oedipus appears, and cannot decide which road to travel. He even thinks of returning to Corinth, since for three nights now his frightening dreams have not haunted him. A lightning flash stops him in his path, and he thinks that the gods have set up a trap, and curses the gods. Just then, Laius arrives on a chariot with two traveling companions and demands the right of way from Oedipus, whom he insults and strikes. In self-defence, Oedipus kills Laius and his companions. When the storm breaks, Oedipus flees. The shepherd has witnessed these events.

Scene Three: Outside Thebes, the Sphinx, a monster in the form of a winged lioness with a woman's head, harasses the Theban citizens, killing everyone who cannot answer her riddle. Oedipus offers to challenge her to save the city. The watchman tells him he who defeats the Sphinx will become the King of Thebes and can marry the recently widowed queen, Jocasta. Oedipus wakes the Sphinx and answers its riddle successfully, which causes the Sphinx to collapse into death, but not before saying: "The future will tell thee whether the dying Sphinx weeps in her defeat or laughs in her victory!" Thebes and its citizens hail Oedipus as their liberator and new king, and offer him Jocasta in marriage.

=== Act III ===
Twenty years have passed and during that time, Thebes has enjoyed peace and prosperity with Oedipus as king. However, Thebes now suffers from a plague epidemic. Creon, brother of Jocasta, has gone to Delphi to consult the Oracle. He returns with the message that the plague will end only after the murderer of Laius has been exposed and punished. The murderer now resides in the city, and will be exiled if he reveals himself willingly, but if not, will be cursed and left to the wrath of the gods. Creon has summoned both Tiresias and the old shepherd to the city. Tiresias says nothing initially, but when Oedipus begins to sound accusatory toward him, the prophet points to Oedipus himself. Oedipus is suspicious that Creon wants to usurp him, and dismisses Tiresias and Creon from his sight. Meanwhile, Jocasta tries to comfort Oedipus, and tells of the circumstances of the killing of Laius, which disturbs Oedipus. The shepherd confirms Jocasta's story. From Corinth, Phorbes then arrives to ask Oedipus to succeed Polybus, and then reveals that Polybus and Merope were his adoptive parents, not his biological parents. It turns out that Merope's own child had died at birth, and Phorbes replaced that child with Oedipus, whom the Shepherd had not the heart to abandon to the elements. Oedipus now understands the whole truth, and flees into the palace, realizing that the gods' punishment and prophecy came true after all. Jocasta is horrified at the truth, and commits suicide. Oedipus then emerges, covered in blood, as he has gouged out his eyes in shame and in expiation. Creon then sentences Oedipus to exile, and Oedipus accepts the punishment as the only way to save the city. However, Antigone, Oedipus' favorite daughter, chooses to accompany her father and be his guide.

=== Act IV ===
After years of wandering, Oedipus and Antigone have arrived at a flowery grove at Colonus, near Athens, where Theseus rules with the protection of the Eumenides. Antigone describes the grove to Oedipus, who foresees that he will peacefully die there. Creon then suddenly arrives to tell the news that Thebes is again under threat, and to offer Oedipus the throne back. Oedipus refuses, to which Creon takes Antigone hostage. Theseus and the Athenians arrive and free Antigone from Creon. The Athenians drive Creon away and welcome Oedipus into their city. Finally, however, Oedipus takes his leave of everyone, even Antigone, and settles in the spot where he will die.

== Recordings ==
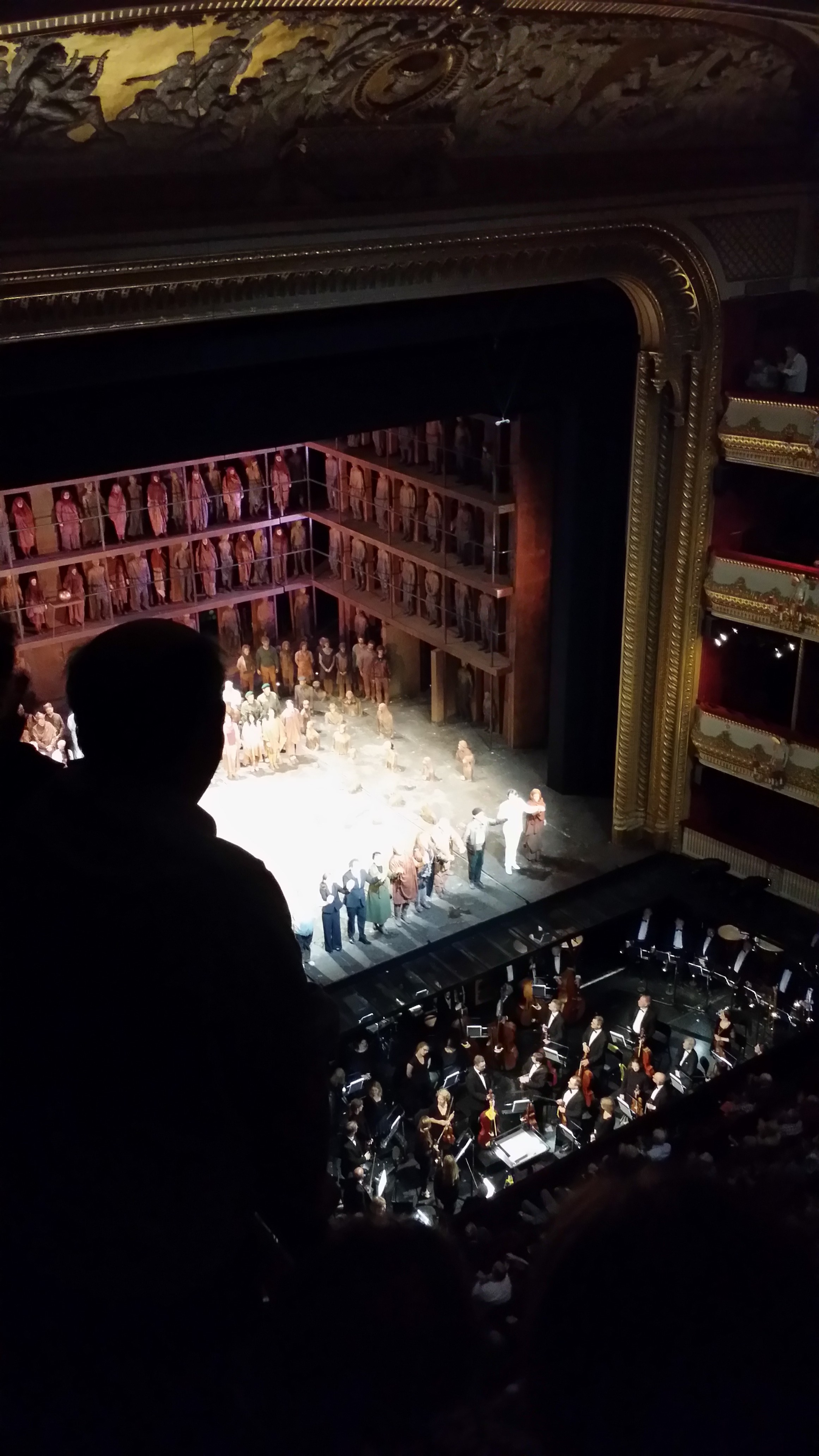
Oedipe (opera) at Royal Opera House in London - standing ovations (24 May 2016).

Key to roles (‡): antigone/jocaste/sphinx/créon/oedipe/tirésias

- INA (Institut national de l'audiovisuel) archive (live in Paris in 1955): Monmart/Moizan/Gorr/Lovano/Depraz/Vessières(‡); Charles Bruck, conductor
- Electrecord EDC 269/270/271 (recorded in 1964 in a Bucharest studio, in Romanian): Sindrilaru/Cernei/Pally/Iordăchescu/Ohanesian/Hvorov(‡); Brediceanu, conductor
- EMI Classics 7 54011-2 (recorded in 1989 at Monte Carlo's Salle Garnier): José van Dam, Gabriel Bacquier, Marjana Lipovšek, Brigitte Fassbaender, John Aler, Nicolai Gedda, Marcel Vanaud, Barbara Hendricks, Gino Quilico, Jocelyne Taillon, Cornelius Hauptmann, Laurence Albert, Jean-Philippe Courtis, Isabelle Vernet; Orfeon Donostiarra; Monte Carlo Philharmonic Orchestra; Lawrence Foster, conductor
- Naxos 8.660163-64 (recording of an incomplete version given in Vienna in 1997): Monte Pederson, Marjana Lipovšek, Egil Siliņš, Yu Chen, Davide Damiani, Ruxandra Donose, Walter Fink, Josef Hopferwieser, Peter Koves, Michael Roider, Goran Simic, Mihaela Ungureanu; Vienna Boys Choir; Orchestra and Chorus of the Vienna State Opera; Michael Gielen, conductor
- Albany Records TROY861-62 (recorded live in Urbana at the 2005 U.S. premiere): Stefan Ignat, Ricardo Herrera, Bradley Robinson, Harold Gray Meers, Michael York, Ben Jones, Darren T. Anderson, Ashmani Jha, Stephanie Chigas, Jan Patrice Helms, Jennifer Proulx; University of Illinois Chamber Singers; Sinfonia da Camera; Ian Hobson, conductor
- Internet-streamed video (from La Monnaie/De Munt in Brussels in 2011): Eerens/Petrinsky/Lemieux/Bork/Henschel/Rootering(‡); Leo Hussain, conductor; was expected to be issued as a DVD in 2012
- Opéra Bastille (Paris, France). Wajdi Mouawad (stage director), Ingo Metzmacher (conductor) — With Christopher Maltman (Œdipus), Yann Beuron (Laius), Ekaterina Gubanova (Jocasta), Clive Bayley (Tiresias). Broadcast date: Thursday, October 14, 2021, on Medici.tv, steams though January 14, 2022. © Opéra national de Paris - FRA Productions.
