= Romanian Rhapsodies (Enescu) =

Set of compositions by George Enescu

- Orchestral music by George Enescu
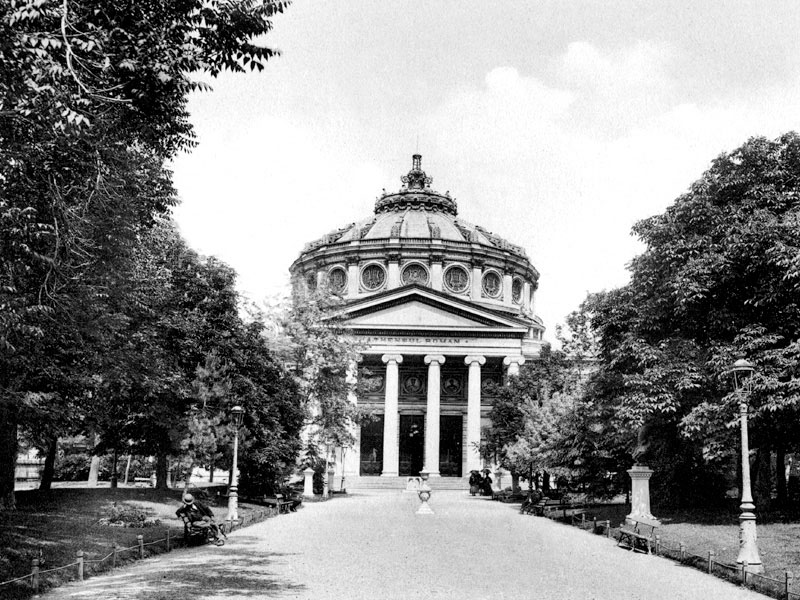
- Romanian Athenaeum, at about the time of the premiere there
- Key: A major (No. 1); D major (No. 2)
- Opus: 11
- Composed: 1901
- Dedication: Bernard Crocé-Spinelli (No. 1)
- Performed: 23 February 1903 Romanian Athenaeum, Bucharest
- Movements: 2
- Scoring: orchestra

The two Romanian Rhapsodies, Op. 11, for orchestra, are George Enescu's best-known compositions. They were written in 1901, and first performed together in 1903. The two rhapsodies, and particularly the first, have long held a permanent place in the repertory of every major orchestra. They employ elements of lăutărească music, vivid Romanian rhythms, and an air of spontaneity. They exhibit exotic modal coloring, with some scales having 'mobile' thirds, sixths or sevenths, creating a shifting major/minor atmosphere, one of the characteristics of Romanian music. They also incorporate some material found in the later drafts of Enescu's Poème roumaine, Op. 1.

== History ==
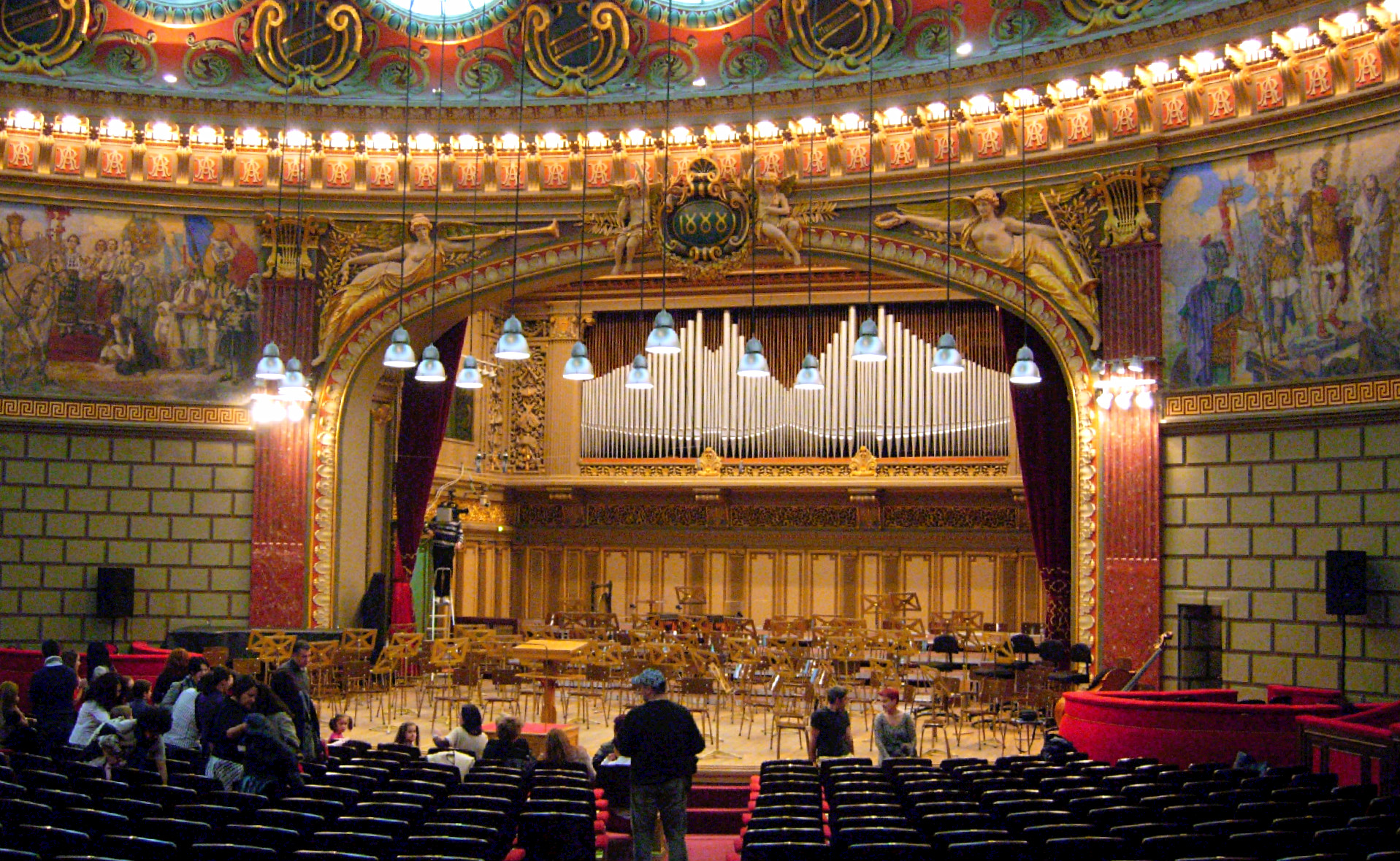
The stage of the Athenaeum in Bucharest

The two Romanian Rhapsodies were composed in Paris, and premiered together in a concert at the Romanian Athenaeum in Bucharest which also included the world premiere of Enescu's First Suite for Orchestra, Op. 9 (1903). The composer conducted all three of his own works, which were preceded on the programme by Berlioz's Overture to Les francs-juges and Schumann's Symphony No. 1, both conducted by Eduard Wachmann. The concert took place on 23 February 1903 (according to the Julian calendar in use in Romania at that time; 8 March 1903 Gregorian). The Second Rhapsody was played first, and Enescu maintained this order of performance throughout his life.

== Rhapsody No. 1 in A major ==
The Rhapsody No. 1 in A major is dedicated to the composer and pedagogue Bernard Crocé-Spinelli (a fellow student with Enescu in André Gedalge's counterpoint class at the Conservatoire), and is the better known of the two rhapsodies. The essence of this rhapsody is the dance. Enescu claimed that it was "just a few tunes thrown together without thinking about it", but his surviving sketches show that he carefully worked out the order in which the melodies should appear, and the best instrumental setting for each one. It was completed on 14 August 1901, when Enescu was still only 19 years old.

According to the published score, the instrumentation is: 3 flutes (3rd doubling piccolo), 2 oboes, cor anglais, 2 clarinets in A, 2 bassoons, 4 horns, 2 trumpets in C, 2 cornets in A, 3 trombones, tuba, 3 timpani, triangle, snare drum, cymbals, 2 harps, violins I & II, violas, violoncellos, contrabasses.

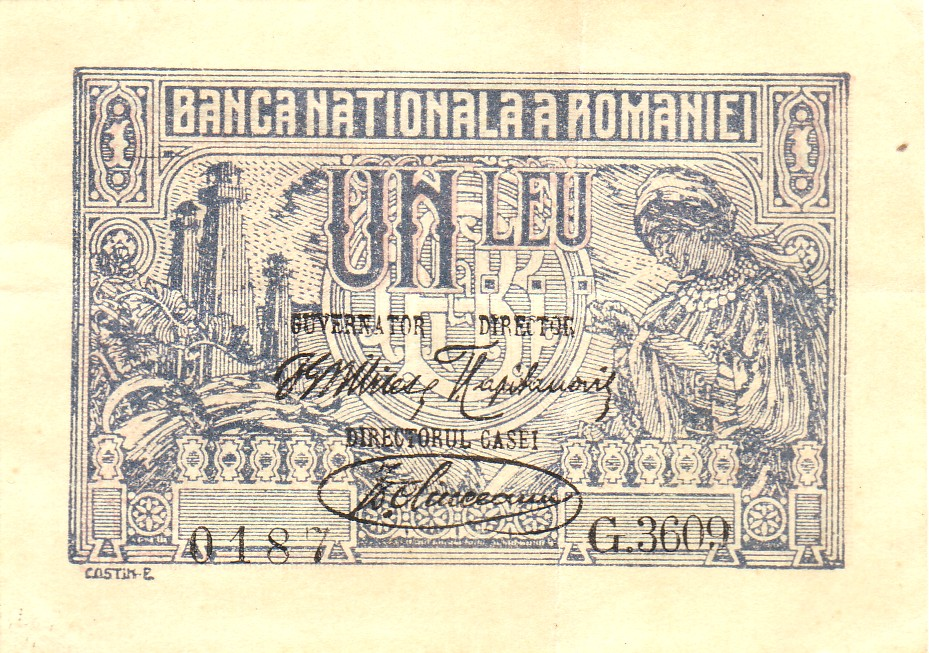
One-leu bank note (1920)

The First Rhapsody is ebullient and outgoing. It begins by quoting the folk song "Am un leu şi vreau să-l beau" (variously translated as "I want to spend my money on drink", "I have a coin, and I want a drink", "I want to spend my shilling on drink", or, more literally, "I have a leu and I want to drink it"), which is played by oboes and clarinets. The tune was played by the Romani violinist Lae Chioru (Nicolae Filip), from whom Enescu had his first violin lessons at the age of 4, but there is some doubt whether Enescu actually remembered it from Chioru, since the tune had been in circulation in various collections printed as early as 1848 (alternative spelling: "Am un leu şi vreau să-l beu"), which Enescu could have consulted. This is soon replaced with a slower melody first introduced in the violins. As the work progresses, this tune grows faster and livelier to climax in a vibrant whirling folk dance, which quotes heavily from the melody from "Ciocârlia" ("The skylark"), a folk tune allegedly composed by the Romani composer Angheluș Dinicu.

It is worth noting that Enescu may have derived some musical inspiration for the First Rhapsody from the Phanariot Greek upper classes of Romania, whose ancestry was in Constantinople [today's Istanbul] and whose musical traditions include the popular song Karotsieris ["Καροτσερι τραβα]," which originated in the Tatavla district of the metropolis. Apart from the that, Enescu used two other themes that were also popular in the Greek repertoire: that of the song “Karmaniola” (known as “I flogeri sou i matia” or “San apothano”) and that of the song “Vlacha xakousti”.

Enescu conducted the First Rhapsody at what proved to be his New York farewell concert with members of the New York Philharmonic on 21 January 1950. The concert was billed as a commemoration of his 60th year as an artist, and in it he appeared as violinist together with Yehudi Menuhin in Bach's Concerto for Two Violins, as pianist in his own Sonata No. 3 for Violin and Piano (also with Menuhin), and as conductor of his Suite No. 2 for Orchestra, Op. 20, and the Rhapsody, which concluded the programme.

== Rhapsody No. 2 in D major ==
The Second Rhapsody, like the first, was completed in 1901, but is more inward and reflective. Its essential character is not dance, but song. It is based on the popular 19th-century ballad "Pe o stîncă neagră, într-un vechi castel" ("On a dark rock, in an old castle") which, like the opening melody of the First Rhapsody Enescu may have learned from the lăutar Chioru, though again there is some doubt whether Enescu actually remembered it from Chioru. After a development culminating in a canonic presentation, this theme is joined by a dance tune, "Sîrba lui Pompieru" ("Sîrba of the Fireman"), followed shortly afterward by the second half of a folksong, "Văleu, lupu mă mănîncă" ("Aiee, I'm being devoured by a wolf!"), which is treated in canon. Toward the end there is a brief moment of animation, bringing to mind the spirit of country lăutari, but the work ends quietly.

Unlike the First Rhapsody, there is no controversy at all about the scoring of the Second, which is given in the published score as: 3 flutes, 2 oboes, cor anglais, 2 clarinets in A, 2 bassoons, 4 horns, 2 trumpets in C, 3 trombones, 2 timpani, cymbal, 2 harps, first violins, second violins, violas, cellos, and double basses.

== Third Rhapsody ==
At the New York World's Fair, on 8 May 1939 Enescu conducted a programme of Romanian compositions, which included his Second Romanian Rhapsody. The anonymous programme note stated:

This is the second of the set of Trois Rhapsodies Roumaines, Op. 11, in which Enesco has remembered the folk songs of his own country. The first and best known of the set is in A major; the third is in G minor.

Although subsequent sources have occasionally referred to this "Third Rhapsody", it does not appear ever to have existed.

== Legacy ==
External audio
- Rhapsody No. 1 conducted by Eugene Ormandy, Rhapsody No. 2 conducted by Hans Kindler here

For all their popularity, the two Romanian Rhapsodies proved to be "an albatross round Enescu's neck: later in his life he bitterly resented the way they had dominated and narrowed his reputation as a composer". He himself recorded each of the rhapsodies three times, but he viewed requests for yet more recordings as "un [sic] grosse affaire commerciale".

Both rhapsodies have received dozens of recordings by other conductors and orchestras.
