= Cornel Țăranu =

Romanian composer and conductor (1934–2023)

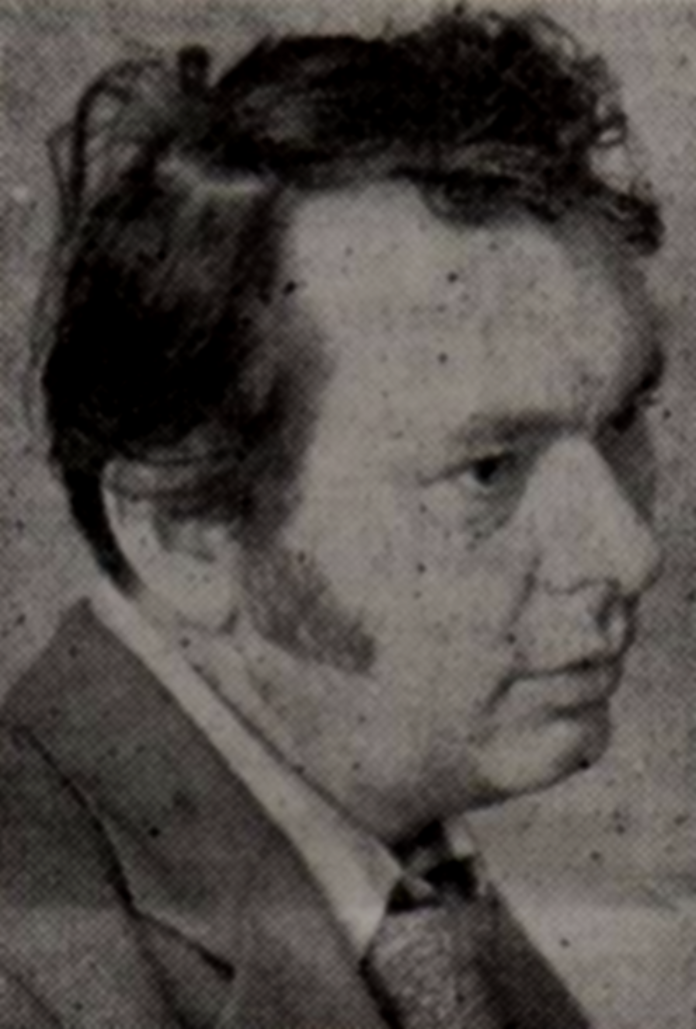
- Țăranu in 1975
- Born: 20 June 1934; Cluj, Kingdom of Romania
- Died: 18 June 2023 (aged 88); Cluj-Napoca, Romania
- Education: Cluj Conservatoire (Gheorghe Dima Academy)
- Occupations: Composer; musicologist; conductor; cultural manager; translator
- Organizations: Gheorghe Dima Academy; Ars Nova; Union of Romanian Composers
- Spouse: Dana Țăranu-Mărgineanu
- Relatives: Nicolae Mărgineanu Sr (father-in-law); Nicolae Mărgineanu Jr (brother-in-law)
- Awards: Koussevitzky Prize; Ordre des Arts et des Lettres

Cornel Țăranu ([korˈnel t͡səˈranu]; 20 June 1934 – 18 June 2023) was a Romanian classical composer, musicologist, conductor and cultural manager. A native of Cluj-Napoca in Transylvania, he was always attached to this region, and contributed to cultural cooperation between Romanian and ethnic Hungarian musicians. He studied locally, at the Cluj Academy, assimilating the local avatar of neoclassicism, alongside influences from Romanian folk music—though his debut years also evidenced conformity with Socialist Realism, he was reportedly censured by the communist regime for keeping company with sidelined figures, such as the poet Lucian Blaga. A teacher at his alma mater, he furthered his studies abroad, at the Conservatoire de Paris, becoming an authority on, and posthumous disciple of, George Enescu. Braving controversy, he worked on completing unfinished scores by Enescu, including his Fifth Symphony and a musical poem, Strigoii. In parallel, he founded Cluj's Ars Nova, a chamber orchestra dedicated to contemporary classical music and performance art.

Țăranu's main compositions focus on orchestral work; he wrote two operas, vocal music for soloists and choirs, and critically acclaimed film scores. His style transitioned into a postmodernism with expressionist tinges, used mainly in his shorter pieces, but remained largely neoclassical in his four symphonies. His personal project was a musical companion to modern Romanian literature, directing him to explore various other sources of inspiration. Depending on context, his contributions were informed by folklore (Romanian, Romani and Greek), Byzantine music, and jazz. He also produced a number of distinctly historicist pieces, which took inspiration from political or descriptive texts in the history of Transylvania. Achieving mainstream recognition in the 1980s, when he won the Koussevitzky Prize, Țăranu maintained his reputation after the Romanian Revolution of 1989. A Chevalier of the Ordre des Arts et des Lettres in 2002, he directed the music festival Cluj Modern, and was a long-serving vice president of the Union of Romanian Composers. His film work included collaborations with his brother-in law, director Nicolae Mărgineanu; he was also the son-in-law of psychologist Nicolae Mărgineanu Sr.

== Biography ==
=== Early life and neoclassical debut ===
Țăranu was born in the Transylvanian city of Cluj (now Cluj-Napoca), and, into his thirties, represented the "Cluj outlook on music", with its blend of neoclassicism, national folklore, and modernist music. In 1998, Țăranu's colleague Ferenc László praised him as one of the few Transylvanian composers, whether Romanian or Hungarian, who chose not to leave their "rural" region for success abroad: "As a flexible mind, he succeeded in what few Transylvanians manage: while he lives in Cluj, his work travels around the world." He came from a musical family: "My parents were genuine aficionados, they frequented Cluj's musical milieu, my father played the violin and had a great ear for music. I began to study music at a very early age, then, in the most spontaneous way, I started to improvise, to work on my very own tiny essays in composition."

Țăranu studied at the local Conservatoire (later the Gheorghe Dima Academy) from 1951 to 1957—piano with Romeo Ghircoiașiu and composition with Sigismund Toduță. The latter is credited as Țăranu's first master by fellow composer Doru Popovici. Fifty years later, Țăranu noted that Toduță, as the son in law of the political prisoner Ioan Suciu, was especially fragile and cautious, for being easily blackmailed by the communist authorities. Lacking a "balance between sincerity and diplomacy", he publicly spoke of his teacher as the Romanian Brahms, unaware that such praise of the classics would make Toduță even more exposed to persecution. His other early mentors were professors Marțian Negrea, Eliza Ciolan, and Antonin Ciolan; the latter, a conductor, nurtured his talent—even though Țăranu did not yet take up conducting as a specialization. He ignored his piano studies and skipped class "whenever I could", mainly because piano and mandatory lessons of Marxism-Leninism left him little time to work on his musical scores. Popovici was present for Țăranu's debut as a composer, in spring 1955, with the Trio for violin, viola and cello. In a 1962 retrospective, he reports: "Though written down during his years as a student, the work carried the seal of authentic sensibility and had its lyrical content [...] concealed by a concise format, wherein melodies created in the folk style would blend into each other masterfully, evidencing his affinity with the polyphonic style."

According to Popovici, Țăranu's first works, including his arrangement of anti-war poems by Nicolae Labiș, came to be deeply influenced by Enescu and Béla Bartók. His and Toduță's works of the period, like Labiș's poems, were also indebted to Socialist Realism, as "songs for the masses"—including a "programmatic and descriptive" piece that Țăranu wrote for Liberation Day 1959. In 2006, Țăranu spoke of his non-publicized clashes with the Romanian Workers' Party (PMR) and its cultural dogma. As he notes, the troubles started in April 1957, when, as part of his academic assignments, he composed a piece based on Cetini negre, by the poet-philosopher Blaga. It was performed by the Transylvania State Philharmonic Orchestra just days before Blaga was officially blacklisted by communist censors as a "mystical" poet, with Țăranu himself being kept under close watch, for alleged political deviation, until 1959. Țăranu, who was still on friendly terms with former members of the anti-communist Sibiu Literary Circle, also kept contacting Blaga. He offered to write an opera based on Blaga's Învierea, being unaware that the poem had already been scored by Blaga's own brother-in-law, Tiberiu Brediceanu. His faux-pas caused a conflict between Blaga and his wife Cornelia, both of whom shunned Țăranu.

Țăranu began teaching at his alma mater in 1957, originally as a lecturer in Toduță's class. Late 1962 saw the premiere of his Sinfonia brevis, a 12-minute-long symphony and pastiche of Enescu's First. It was positively reviewed by musicologist George Bălan: "Striving to connect with Enescu's thought, Țăranu views life the same way Enescu would have, had he still been alive today." In 1963, Tîrgu Mureș State Orchestra recorded his hymn for the PMR, with lyrics by Miron Scorobete. That year, music critic Iván Kováts wrote about Țăranu's own activity as a music journalist, praising him for covering the "most up-to-date musical creations"; according to Kováts, Țăranu and Bălan were the leading musicologists active in postwar Romania. In 2023, Alex Vasiliu, himself a music journalist, looked back on Țăranu's contribution as a critic under communism: "Even when ideological avatars have more or less altered the objectivity of many a chronicler, the value of commentary from these past decades endures as almost unblemished, or even intact, when these have been written by musicologists and composers with immaculate training, educated and committed to the truth. Cornel Țăranu a was an indelible portion of that latter category."

The young composer was at the time performing his music in both Romania and the Hungarian People's Republic, generally in collaboration with conductor Mircea Cristescu; one such piece was the musical version of a poem by Attila József. Also in 1963, Țăranu provided theater music for Anatol Constantin's production of Hamlet, taken up by the National Theater Cluj. He then provided the film score to József Somogyi's Ítélet, a György Dózsa biopic co-produced by studios in Hungary, Romania, and Slovakia in 1969. In mid-1966, with letters of recommendation from art critic Petru Comarnescu, Țăranu joined the first group of students that the Romanian communist regime had vetted for travel beyond the Iron Curtain—as he recalls, the group also included filmmaker Lucian Pintilie, theater director Andrei Șerban, and actress Irina Petrescu. Comarnescu's credentials allowed him to visit with some leading Romanian exiles, including scholar Ionel Jianu, who took him on an impromptu tour of French artists' studios. As he explained in old age, France was "an extremely rich learning experience."

=== Paris studies and Ars Nova ===
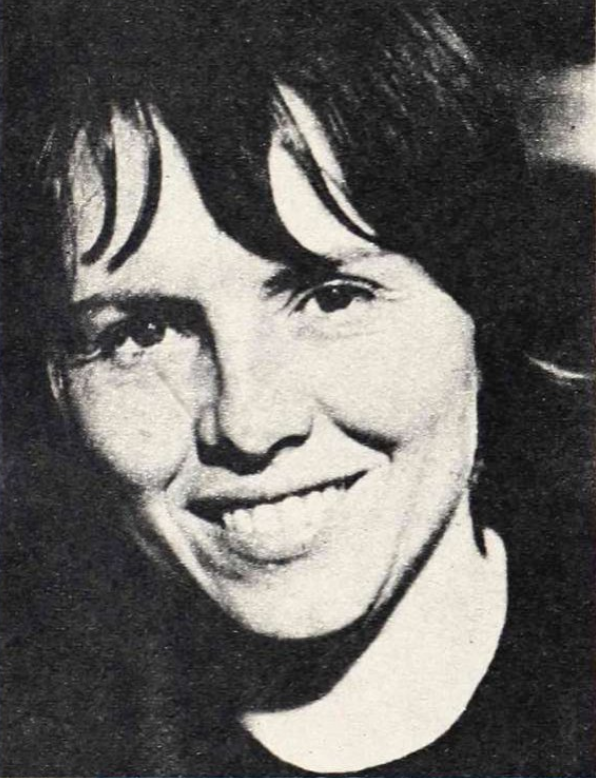
Ars Nova vocalist Ágnes Kriza in 1978

Țăranu studied music theory at the Conservatoire de Paris with Nadia Boulanger and Olivier Messiaen. The two figures disliked each other, but they also mutually resented Țăranu: among the Eastern Bloc students, Boulanger only appreciated the Poles, while Messiaen saw all Eastern Europeans as assets of the KGB. Țăranu eventually managed to obtain Messiaen's affection by showing him that he had learned Turangalîla-Symphonie by heart. Țăranu also attended the Darmstädter Ferienkurse in 1968, 1969 and 1972, studying analysis with György Ligeti, conducting with Bruno Maderna and percussion with Christoph Caskel. He completed his studies with a doctorate in 1969; his thesis about "Enescu in the consciousness of the present" was published in Romanian that year, and in French in 1981. According to László, the contribution also functions as "an excellent stylistic textbook".

Țăranu soon returned to his passion for literature. As noted in 2008 by Apostrof magazine, he "knows contemporary poetry as good as any literary historian, and loves it the way poets do". He still identified Blaga, alongside the modernist doyen Tristan Tzara (whose love poetry was adapted by Țăranu into five pieces of music) and 1960s poet Nichita Stănescu, as his most treasured mentor. He credited Stănescu, Ana Blandiana, Marin Sorescu and Cezar Baltag as his dear friends, who provided him with a sense that "something was moving" in Romanian art. Around that time, he translated Blaga's poem Întoarcere into French, which was republished in 2008 (according to the staff writers at Vatra, his version was "admirable"). His work as a composer focused on bridging music and literature, for instance with a series of lieds inspired by Blandiana's verse, first performed for the public in February 1969. In tandem, he contributed several interpretations of novels by his more senior friend, Camil Petrescu. He also scored lyrical fragments from Petrescu's Patul lui Procust, which fascinated him as "strange poems", and which were taken up by the Gulbenkian Orchestra at the Royan Festival of 1972.

On 20 June 1968, taking his inspiration from France's Domaine musical, Țăranu founded the Ars Nova chamber orchestra, that he directed and conducted—including during their first appearance at Toamna Muzicală Clujeană (TMC) festival in October of that year. In a 1969 conversation with Iosif Sava, he mentioned "the widespread echos that the youthful ensemble has stirred among the composers in both Cluj and Bucharest, who have stated their wish to provide a permanent stream of new works for [its] repertoire." As Vasiliu writes, the new institution carried significance for "the entirety of Romania's musical realm, given that Cluj's instrumentalists were frequently featured on the country's stages, recorded albums, distributed works of national provenance by means of international tours." Already in 1970, the group spent a week performing in London, including at Queen Elizabeth Hall. It was during this tour that their star singer, Hungarian Ágnes Kriza, was discovered by Gennady Rozhdestvensky, who helped her build an international career. Ars Nova and its conductor reportedly enjoyed resounding success at the Warsaw Autumn of 1973. In June 1981, Țăranu himself noted that Ars Nova's live performances had been recorded in London, Paris, Brussels, Mannheim, Zagreb, and Budapest.

Advocating a permanent dialogue between the modernists and the traditionalists, by 1973 Țăranu had built up a unique repertoire, which moved between Johann Sebastian Bach (as orchestrated by Anton Webern), Vasile Herman, Mihai Moldovan, and Peter Maxwell Davies. As noted that year by Janusz Ekiert of Polskie Radio, the general (and best-liked) trait of such selections, and of Țăranu's own pieces, was a "diaphanous" quality. The orchestra had its first LP issued nationally, by Electrecord, in mid-1975; it included compositions by Țăranu, Moldovan, Tiberiu Olah, Dan Constantinescu, and George Draga. Over the following decade, Ars Nova had expanded into performance art, through collaborations with Contemp dance troupe (managed by Adina Cezar). At the 1982 TMC, Contemp danced to music by Țăranu, Aurel Stroe, and Janine Charbonnier. The show was poorly reviewed by conductor Casiu Barbu, who suggested that Ars Nova was too obvious and "pedagogical" in its experimentation.

Țăranu completed his habilitation in 1974, having been an assistant professor from 1970, and becoming a full professor in 1990. Fellow musicologist Ana-Stanca Tabarasi-Hoffmann notes that, by 2021, he was "one of the leading experts on Enescu's work". Țăranu's musicological research was focused on contemporary Romanian music including Enescu, Moldovan, Liviu Glodeanu, and Toduță, and on works by Messiaen, Karlheinz Stockhausen and Iannis Xenakis. One of his contributions in the field was in reconstructing and orchestrating unfinished scores by Enescu: parts of the Caprice Roumain pour violon et orchestre, as well as Strigoii (which was originally Enescu's attempt at scoring a poem by Mihai Eminescu), and, with Pascal Bentoiu, the Fifth Symphony (specifically, he worked on the Symphony's Parts I and IV). Music journalist Luminița Vartolomei commented on this project being "controversial, because it goes against a wish that Enescu himself has adamantly expressed", namely: "I never published works that I didn't view as relatively completed" (N-am publicat niciodată ceva ce nu consideram ca relativ terminat).

In its piano-only version, Strigoii was performed by Țăranu himself at the 1972 TMC, but, as Tabarasi-Hoffmann recalls, it was "insufficiently covered" by the musical press. Among the music critics who took it into consideration, Radu Gheciu argued that Țăranu's reconstructionist project was questionable, since Strigoii could hardly be regarded as Enescu's composition—it was "the work of another composer, with Enescu's motifs and style." Țăranu continued to refine the piece and presented it for limited auditions in February–March 1981, at a Bucharest gala organized by Scînteia, and then at the Romanian National Opera. As argued by Vartolomei, this second version of Strigoii, though not yet fully polished, was a "confirmation of value". In 1989, László noted that Țăranu's "great skill and love" in rendering both Strigoii and the Fifth Symphony (which is also partly based on Eminescu) gave the public an idea of the intellectual relationship that existed between Enescu and Eminescu.

=== Postmodernism and historicism ===
As Kováts notes, Țăranu's music had come to reject traditionalism during the early 1960s: like Olah and Anatol Vieru, "Cornel Țăranu completely renounced the old, tested—and quickly successful—creative methods. We have to say that his new work is neither catchy nor attractive, as much as it is modern and contemporary." As time progressed, he embraced postmodernism, for both score and philosophical themes. Experimentation was central to his 1970 opera, Secretul lui Don Giovanni ("Secret of Don Giovanni"), done from a libretto by Ilie Balea (with Tamás Deák credited as the intellectual source), and choreographed by Éva Maksay. The composition was subtitled "three lyrical sarcasms"; it ignored operatic conventions, using jazz and dance music as its standards. In a 1975 piece, done from Eminescu's "Ode in Ancient Meter" and recorded with baritone Ion Budoiu, Țăranu closely adhered to Enescu's standards—as argued by critic Radu Stancu, he was in succession to Œdipe. Similarly, the 1981 piece Prolegomenes II is written for the Enescu centennial, and is strongly influenced by his music.

Also in 1975, Ars Nova recorded his Tombeau de Verlaine, to a text by Stéphane Mallarmé, during a series of "debate-concerts" hosted by the Romanian Television; it was done for piano, percussion, and two female voices—Kriza and Edita Simion. According to Stan, it marked a peak in that collection: "very singable, very Latin, very well put together." The 1983 Cîntece nomade ("Nomad Songs"), which put to music Baltag's poetic work (and, through it, the staples of Romani folklore), is regarded by critic Virgil Mihaiu as stylistically undefined, an "open work" of "cultural synthesis". Mihaiu argued that it contained "ancestral echoes" filtered through Blaga's philosophy, but also hints to James Joyce's Finnegans Wake. Musicologist Zoltán Farkas sees Țăranu and Baltag as having created a new narrative genre (the "Gypsy opera"), but also notes that Cîntece nomade is at core a belated contribution to expressionist music.

Țăranu received the prize of the Romanian Composers' Union several times (1972, 1978, 1981, 1982 and 2001). His Ghirlande ("Garlands"), a work of children's music, was issued as an LP by Electrecord. It won him the Koussevitzky Prize for 1982; jury president Alfred Hoffman offered praise to Țăranu's "vigorous style" of "firm conviction, expressed in a lapidary, contemporary and yet specific manner". In 1984, art critic Oliv Mircea noted that Țăranu had moved away from the classical line with its "strong inserts from folk songs", and was one of the composers embracing "serialism, post-serialism, and aleatoricism", veering into electroacoustic music. Other Romanian innovators, cited by Mircea, included Glodeanu, Moldovan, Nicolae Brînduș, Adrian Enescu, Adrian Iorgulescu, Myriam Marbé, and Fred Popovici. In the four symphonies that he authored over three decades, and which were only published together in 2002, Țăranu adhered more strictly to the neoclassical canon, with subdued national influences. In a 1985 retrospective for Scînteia, Doru Popovici assessed that, like Olah, Vieru, Remus Georgescu and others, Țăranu had introduced "new means of expression" to the "songs for the masses"; these were positive examples, fitting the ideological mold of "Socialist Romania": "We require that songs for the masses have a lyrical content, that highlights the country's beauties, the spiritual bliss one gets from harmony with all of Earth's lovely creatures, the generosity of decent men, namely those who do not live merely for their personal satisfaction, but, first and foremost, for the advancement of society".

As the author of music for films, Țăranu returned in 1976 with Red Apples, a project by Alexandru Tatos and Ion Băieșu. He and director Nicolae Mărgineanu Jr worked on the 1979 film Un om în loden, which earned them both awards at the 1980 film festival in Costinești. In 1983, he composed the score to Mărgineanu's Return from Hell, done from a short story by Ion Agârbiceanu. His contribution earned praise from film critics at Cinema, who spoke of Țăranu's music as being in "perfect unity" with Mărgineanu's direction, as well as a top prize from the Romanian Filmmakers' Association. The composer was by then married to Mărgineanu's sister Dana, a teacher of English. This made him the son-in-law of psychologist and former political prisoner Nicolae Mărgineanu (1905–1980); his mother-in-law, Eufrosina, was the daughter of Konstantinos Arvanitis, a merchant and published diarist of Graeco-Bulgarian descent. The director and composer embarked on another, similarly celebrated collaboration on the 1987 Pădureanca, which earned Țăranu another award at the Costinești film gala.

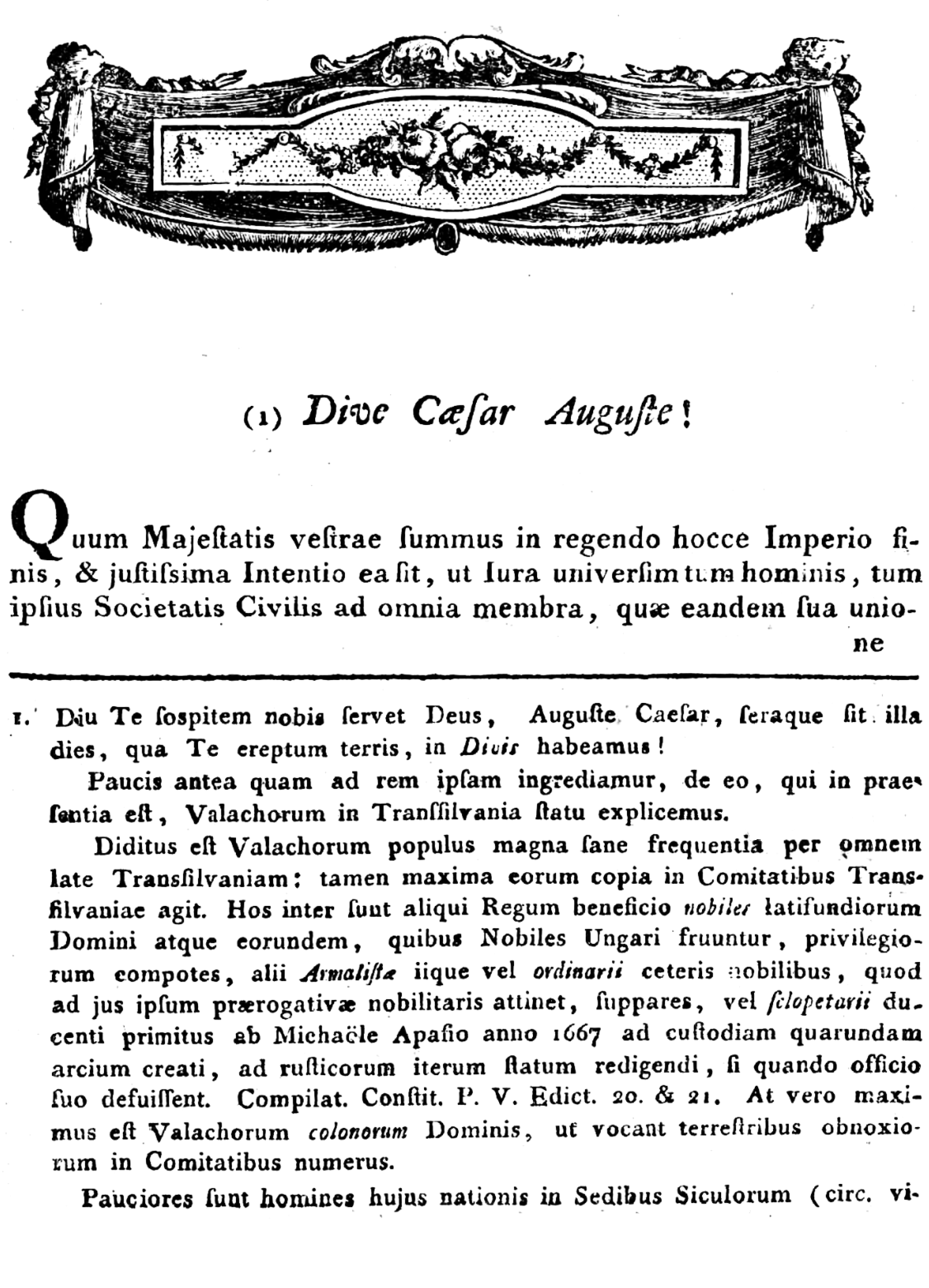
Opening lines of the Supplex Libellus Valachorum, which was used as a basis for Țăranu's historicist pieces

Late in 1987, Țăranu's Symphony No. 4 "Ritornele", which functioned as his "essay on form", was a centerpiece of the TMC. During the TMC's 1989 edition, Țăranu premiered several new works, all of which garnered praise from critics such as Casiu Barbu: a toccata for saxophone, percussion and piano; a vocal symphony based on texts by Paul Celan; and the especially successful Testament, using Byzantine music and Teodora Cantacuzino's last will as its two sources of inspiration. This formed part of a series of historicist works, which focused on prosaic texts with poetic nuances—also including pieces based on the Supplex Libellus Valachorum, an 1872 Latinate obituary to the national hero Avram Iancu, and an inscription from Roman Dacia. According to Țăranu's own recollections, Testament was performed by the prestigious Madrigal Choir in 1988, but immediately after banned by the communist regime.

=== Old age ===
After the December 1989 Revolution toppled Romanian communism, and before the ethnic turmoil in Transylvania, Țăranu spoke out in support of peace with the Hungarian community—his January 1990 article in Szabadság called for a restoration of the Bolyai University as a regional Hungarian center of learning. He was receiving accolades for his work as an educator, and specifically for his contribution to fostering intercultural understanding. As noted by László, Țăranu was fluent in Hungarian (as well as English, French, German and Russian), and could establish permanent links with his students. These "did not have to suppress their Hungarianness in the class of a Romanian teacher, and Țăranu even support[ed] their affirmation." Reportedly, Țăranu was also the first person to advocate for the erection of a Christian cross on Cetățuia Hill—a previous such symbol had been destroyed by the communists in 1948. He wrote the music to another Mărgineanu film, Somewhere in the East, which premiered in 1991; based on a novel by Augustin Buzura, it told the story of communist crimes during the collectivization of agriculture. His wife Dana became involved with the effort to recover information about the communist imprisonment of civilians such as her father, joining the Cluj branch of Memoria Cultural Institute.

On 31 January 1990, the Union of Romanian Composers, affiliated with the National Salvation Front, elected Bentoiu as its leader, with Țăranu and Iorgulescu as his two vice presidents. Țăranu continued to serve as such for more than two decades. In May 1993, he and Ars Nova appeared at the Romanian Atheneum in Bucharest for the International Music Week. This concert was described as "fascinating" by composer Sorin Vulcu, who was impressed by the "consummate refinement" of Țăranu and his pupils in performing complex works by Herman and Octavian Nemescu. His Cîntece nomade was showcased by Ars Nova at the 1991 Contemporary Music Festival in Budapest—featuring performances by Anton Tauf, Geta Orlovschi, and Călin Forlea. In the mid-1990s, his works, including his Prolegomenes and his homages to Bartók, appeared on Hungarian–Romanian anthology CDs (one put out by the Cluj Academy, the other by Magyar Rádió). Also in 1993, Țăranu became a corresponding member of the Romanian Academy, and a full member in 2012. In 1995, he created a new festival in Cluj-Napoca, as Cluj Modern, thereafter serving as its art director. In 2002, Țăranu was named a Chevalier of the Ordre des Arts et des Lettres.

Alongside French poet Olivier Apert, Țăranu wrote an opera about the Orestes and Oedipus myths, titled Oreste-Oedipe and first performed by the Cluj Conservatory in January 2001; Țăranu was also the conductor, and Ars Nova the performing orchestra on its premiere. Scholar Ion Pop reviews Oreste-Oedipe as a postmodern work with a "difficult score", noting that it borrowed motifs from Enescu and from Greek musical folklore. Țăranu and Tauf reunited for a 2005 production of Blaga's Ivanca, by director Anca Bradu. From 2000, Țăranu's work on Strigoii was continued by Sabin Pautza, who provided an orchestral arrangement and published the completed piece in 2018. Țăranu himself continued to perform into his seventies and eighties. In 2008, Ars Nova celebrated its ruby jubilee with a concert at the Cluj Academy—described in Apostrof as the 40th year of Țăranu's "avant-garde music", or "extreme-contemporary music". In 2013, Țăranu completed the oratorio Lăutarul, which is based on parts of Camil Petrescu's Un om între oameni. In 2015, he appeared at events marking Petrescu's 120th birthday—on 9 April, he directed Petrescu-themed Ars Nova performance at the Art Museum of Cluj. In early October, Transylvania State Philharmonic Orchestra celebrated Țăranu by premiering Lăutarul; actor Cristian Hodrea appeared as Cezar Bolliac. Also featured were a capella pieces based on poems by Eminescu and Matei Călinescu.

The composer's final projects included a film score to another Mărgineanu project, the 2019 Cardinalul. Both he and Mărgineanu were shortlisted for the Filmmakers' Union prize in their respective category. Țăranu died in Cluj-Napoca on 18 June 2023, two days before his 89th birthday. A religious funeral ceremony was scheduled for 22 June at the auditorium maximum of the Cluj Academy. Fellow musicologist Viorel Cosma described him as "guided by fantasy, irony, nobility, but above all by intelligence and unexpected sparkles". The Romanian Academy remembers him as "a complex personality of contemporary Romanian cultural life, an illustrious creator and teacher". In addition to his writing and arranging music, he had been an art collector, who owned paintings by Nicolae Grigorescu, Gheorghe Petrașcu, and Nicolae Tonitza.

== Selected works ==
Alongside orchestral work, film scores, chamber music, and his two operas, Țăranu composed vocal works for soloists and choirs. In addition to Baltag, Blaga, Blandiana, Celan, Eminescu, Labiș and Tzara, his compositions used poems by, among others, Nichita Stănescu and Vladimir Streinu.

His compositions include:

- Trio for violin, viola and cello, 1952
- Poem-Sonata for clarinet and piano, 1954
- Transylvanische Ballade for cello and piano, 1956
- Cetini negre, to texts by Lucian Blaga, 1957
- Sequences for string orchestra, 1960
- Sonata Ostinato for piano, 1961
- Contrastes I for piano, 1962
- Sinfonia brevis, 1962
- Two Madrigals based on texts by Attila József, for women's choir, 1962
- Partidului, to a text by Miron Scorobete, for mixed choir, 1963
- Doina to a text by Camil Baltazar, for mixed choir, 1963
- Horea's Oak, cantata to a text by Leonida Neamțu, for women's choir and orchestra, 1963
- Oboe Sonata, 1963
- Contrastes II for piano, 1963
- Two Madrigals to texts by Blaga, for women's choir, 1964
- Two Madrigals to texts by Ion Vinea, for women's choir, 1965
- Symmetries, 1965
- Incantations, 1965
- Zwei Madrigale to texts by Endre Ady for mixed choir, 1965–66
- Piano Concerto, 1966
- Intercalations for piano and orchestra, 1967
- Dialogues II for piano, 1967
- Sinfonietta giocosa for string orchestra, 1968
- Alternances, 1968
- Lieduri pe versuri de Ana Blandiana, 1969
- Secretul lui Don Giovanni, opera, 1969–70
- Raccords for small orchestra, 1971
- Supplex I for mixed choir, 1971
- Cortège, cantata in memoriam Avram Iancu, for mixed choir and orchestra, 1973
- Supplex II, cantata for mixed choir and small orchestra, 1974
- Long Song for clarinet, piano and string orchestra, 1974
- Tombeau de Verlaine, to a text by Stéphane Mallarmé, 1975
- Symphony No. 2 "Aulodica", 1975–76
- Cantus Transylvaniae, cantata for mixed choir and small orchestra, 1978
- Garlands, 1979
- Prolegomenes I for piano and string quartet, 1981
- Cîntece nomade to texts by Cezar Baltag, for mixed choir and orchestra, 1983
- Prolegomenes II for piano and string orchestra, 1982
- Sinfonietta "Pro Juventute" for string orchestra, 1984
- Symphony No. 3 "Signes", 1984
- Sonata for clarinet and percussion, 1985
- Horea to a text by Nichita Stănescu, for mixed choir, 1985
- Sonata rubato I for oboe, 1986
- Symphony No. 4 "Ritornele", 1987
- Sonata rubato II for oboe, piano and string orchestra, 1988
- Double bass Sonata, 1988
- Testament for mixed choir, 1988
- Solo Sonata for viola, 1990
- Miroirs for soprano saxophone and small orchestra, 1990
- Dedications to a text by Stănescu, for bass, speaker, mixed choir and small orchestra, 1991
- Solo Sonata for cello, 1992
- Cadenze concertante for cello and small orchestra, 1993
- Trajectoires for flute, clarinet, trombone, violin, cello and percussion, 1994
- Crisalide for sopranino saxophone and ensemble, 1995
- Remembering Bartók I for oboe and piano, 1995
- Remembering Bartók II for oboe, string quartet, double bass, piano and percussion, 1995,
- Remembering Bartók III for soprano saxophone and ensemble, 1995
- Responsorial I for clarinets, piano and percussion, 1996
- Responsorial II for soprano saxophone and alto saxophone, 1996
- Antiphona for flute and orchestra, 1996
- Responsorial III for clarinet, bassoon, violin, cello, piano and percussion, 1997
- Bläserquintett for flute, oboe, clarinet, French horn and bassoon, 1997
- Siciliana Blues for piano and ensemble, 1998
- Concerto for oboe and string orchestra, 1998
- Cadenze per Antiphona for flute, 1998
- Pour Georges for sopranino saxophone and tape, 1999
- Oreste-Oedipe, opera, 1999–2001
- Concerto breve for flute orchestra, 2002
- Modra rijeka – Blue River to a text by Mak Dizdar, for mixed choir, 2002
- Baroccoco, 2004
- Saramandji, 2009
- Lăutarul, oratorio, 2012–13
- Bachiana, 2018
