= Ferhunde Erkin =

Turkish pianist

- Ferhunde and her brother Necdet on August 1, 1926.
- Born: Ferhunde Remzi; June 8, 1909; Istanbul, Ottoman Empire
- Died: July 11, 2007 (aged 98); Istanbul, Turkey
- Education: Hochschule für Musik und Theater (1930)
- Occupation: Pianist
- Spouse: Ulvi Cemal Erkin

Ferhunde Erkin (née Ferhunde Remzi) (June 8, 1909 – July 11, 2007) was a Turkish pianist born in Istanbul.

== Musical career ==
Ferhunde Remzi started her first lessons in Bandırma with her father Ali Remzi Yiğitgüden's guidance when her brother Necdet Remzi Atak started violin lessons.

Ferhunde and Necdet later took lessons from several teachers in Istanbul, but mostly from Karl Berger. They gave their first recital in Galatasaray High School on March 20, 1920 when Istanbul was under occupation after the end of World War I.

With the advice of a music teacher, Von Kleibiner, Ferhunde and Necdet applied and received the Alexander von Humboldt Foundation scholarship and went to Hochschule für Musik und Theater in Leipzig. They finished the three-year school in two years and graduated in 1930.

Upon their return to Turkey both started as teachers at Musiki Muallim Mektebi (Music Teachers School) on April 7, 1931. Ferhunde Remzi met Ulvi Cemal Erkin on that same day. They married on September 29, 1932 and had two daughters.

She played in Berlin at wartime in 1943 with Berlin City Orchestra conducted by Fritz Zaun.

She played with Suna Kan from 1961 till 1967 on several local and international concerts.

== Later life and legacy ==
Ferhunde Erkin retired in 1967. Some of her students are Hüseyin Sermet, Nimet Karatekin, composer Nevit Kodallı, Bilge Aydın, Kamuran Gündemir, Filiz Ali, Madlen Saydam, Tekin Alp Ulusoy and Zeren Dirim. She made the first playings of 22 piano concertos in Turkey.

Ferhunde Erkin received the Sevda-Cenap And Music Foundation Honour medal in 1999.

Ferhunde Erkin died in Istanbul, on July 11, 2007.
