= Piano Sonata No. 3 (Enescu) =

Piano composition by George Enescu

- by George Enescu
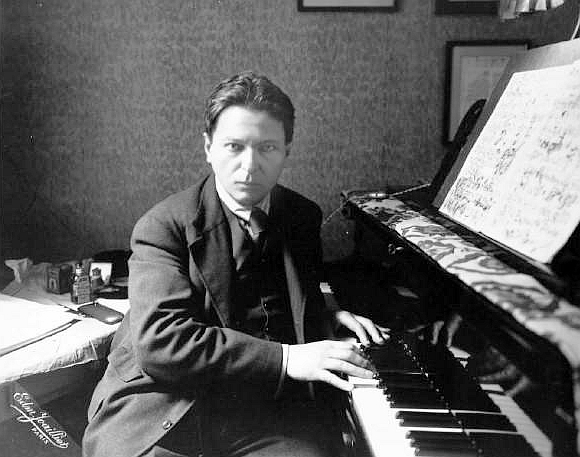
- George Enesco in 1930
- Key: D major
- Opus: 24, No. 3
- Composed: 1933–35
- Dedication: Marcel Ciampi
- Performed: 6 December 1938, Salle Gaveau, Paris
- Movements: 3

The Sonata No. 3 for Piano in D major, Op. 24, No. 3, is a piano sonata by the Romanian composer George Enescu, written between 1933 and 1935.

== History ==
Enescu composed his Third Piano Sonata during an especially dark period in his life. In September 1933 Enescu was abruptly summoned from Paris to Bucharest in order to care for Maruca Cantacuzino, his future wife with whom he had a sometimes troubled relationship since 1914, and who had suffered a mental collapse. Enescu cancelled all of his obligations abroad in order to tend her through the winter, and then fell ill himself with heart trouble, compelling him to extend his leave from the concert stage for the rest of the year. In August 1934, Maruca was involuntarily hospitalised with a diagnosis of anxiety psychosis in a clinic in Purkersdorf near Vienna. This was on the initiative of her adult children, Constantin ("Bâzu") and Alice Cantacuzino, who subsequently took legal action to ensure she would no longer be allowed to govern her own financial affairs. Maruca entered an acute depressive phase, living in total isolation, in the dark, and refusing to eat. Enescu took on the expenses caused by her condition and retreated to a room in the basement of a rented house on the Kiseleff Boulevard in Bucharast, where he devoted himself as best he could to composition.

The Piano Sonata was composed rather quickly. According to annotations in the manuscript, the first movement was completed on 21 October 1933, followed by the second on 22 November, with the finale completed on 8 January 1934. Shortly after its initial completion, Enescu wrote to Edmond Fleg, librettist of his opera Œdipe, reporting on 30 January 1934, "I console myself by taking refuge in composition. The result is a new piano sonata, ... full of gaiety, in complete contrast with the atmosphere which surrounds it!". As was his custom, Enescu then allowed the score to "rest" for a time (while he worked on orchestrating the first movement of his Fourth Symphony), returning to the sonata the next year to make final revisions to the second and third movements, completed respectively on 2 and 11 May 1935

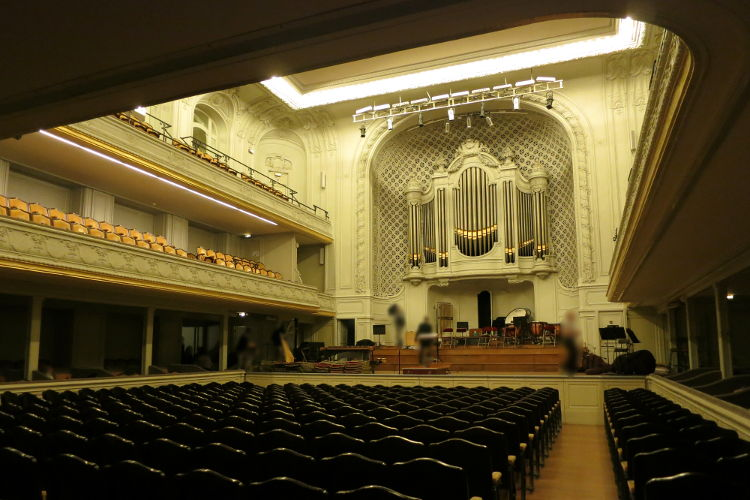
The Salle Gaveau, where the Third Sonata was premiered

Enescu gave a private reading of the sonata to a circle of friends in Bucharest in July 1934, but the public premiere did not take place until 6 December 1938, in a performance by the score's dedicatee, Marcel Ciampi, at the Salle Gaveau in Paris

Enescu designated the work as his Third Piano Sonata. The First Sonata, completed in 1924, had been given the opus number 24 and, as he did in some other cases, Enescu added the new sonata to that opus number, as Op. 24, No. 3. This suggests that there should be a Second Sonata, but no trace of such a work has been found. During a discussion at a 1967 Enescu conference, Marcel Mihalovici, who had been a close friend of the composer, said that when he asked about this missing work, Enescu replied that he had it complete in his mind, and one day would write it out on paper. But that day never came, and Enescu died without doing so.

== Analysis ==
The Sonata is in three movements:

1. Vivace con brio
2. Andantino cantabile
3. Allegro con spirito

The style of the work is neoclassical, with particular reference to harpsichordists such as François Couperin and Domenico Scarlatti, but also recalling Ravel's Tombeau de Couperin.

The opening movement is in sonata-allegro form, though certain aspects are open to interpretation. Pascal Bentoiu proposes that it is a somewhat eccentric adaptation of the form, with two recapitulations, separated by a bridge passage.

The second movement, Andantino cantabile, takes for its main theme a modified version of the secondary theme from the first movement, with a dreamier quality and initially given a monodic presentation, followed immediately by a harmonised variantBentoiu 2010, 333–34). Despite the winding, meditative, drifting, doina character of the movement, it is cast in a sonata-allegro form, but this time with two development sections, an unusually complex recapitulation, and a coda.

The finale is a "capricious rondo", developed principally from the second theme of the slow movement. It begins with figurations that have been described as "the tinkling of bells" and, after a brief interruption, sets off in a relentless toccata-like flux that continues to the end of the movement. In the process, all of the materials from the preceding movements are revisited and transformed in a "tour-de-force of cyclical re-combination".
