= Kamuran Gündemir =

Turkish pianist

Kamuran Gündemir (1933 – February 4, 2006) was a Turkish pianist. Born in Ayvalık, he was influenced by his father, a tuba player in the local municipality band. At the age of three, he learned to read musical notes and began to play the accordion.

Gündemir was discovered by Adnan Saygun, who advised him to attend a conservatory. He enrolled in the Ankara State Conservatory in 1949 and graduated in 1958. During his studies, he was a piano student of Ferhunde Erkin and studied composition under Necil Kazım Akses and Ulvi Cemal Erkin. Following his graduation, he was sent to Paris to study under Lazare Lévy at the Paris Conservatory.

Throughout his career, Gündemir taught several notable students, including Muhiddin Dürrüoğlu-Demiriz, Fazıl Say, Emrecan Yavuz, Emre Elivar, and his last student, Mertol Demirelli.

In recognition of his contributions to music, the Sevda-Cenap And Music Foundation awarded him an honorary gold medal in 2001.
