= Ankara International Music Festival =

Ankara International Music Festival (Turkish: Ankara Uluslararası Müzik Festivali) is a music festival held annually in Ankara, Turkey. In addition to Turkish artists, performers from many countries have participated in the festival. The annual festival was established in 1984 by the Sevda-Cenap And Music Foundation. In addition to Ministry of Culture and Tourism many companies, foundations, diplomatic missions, and the municipality of Çankaya are among the sponsors of the festival.

== 2018 participants ==
- Presidential Symphony Orchestra of Turkey
- Compania Flamenca El Carpeta &Antonio Canales
- Lucas Vondracek
- Franz Liszt Chamber Orchestra
- Sukhishvili Georgian National Ballet
- David Hazeltine Trio
- Bosphorus Trio
- Chorus of Ministry of Culture and Tourism
- Saygun Quartet
- Cyrus Chesnut Trio
- Spellbound Modern Dance Group
- Sibiu Philharmonic Orchestra
