= Mertol Demirelli =

Turkish musician (born 1996)

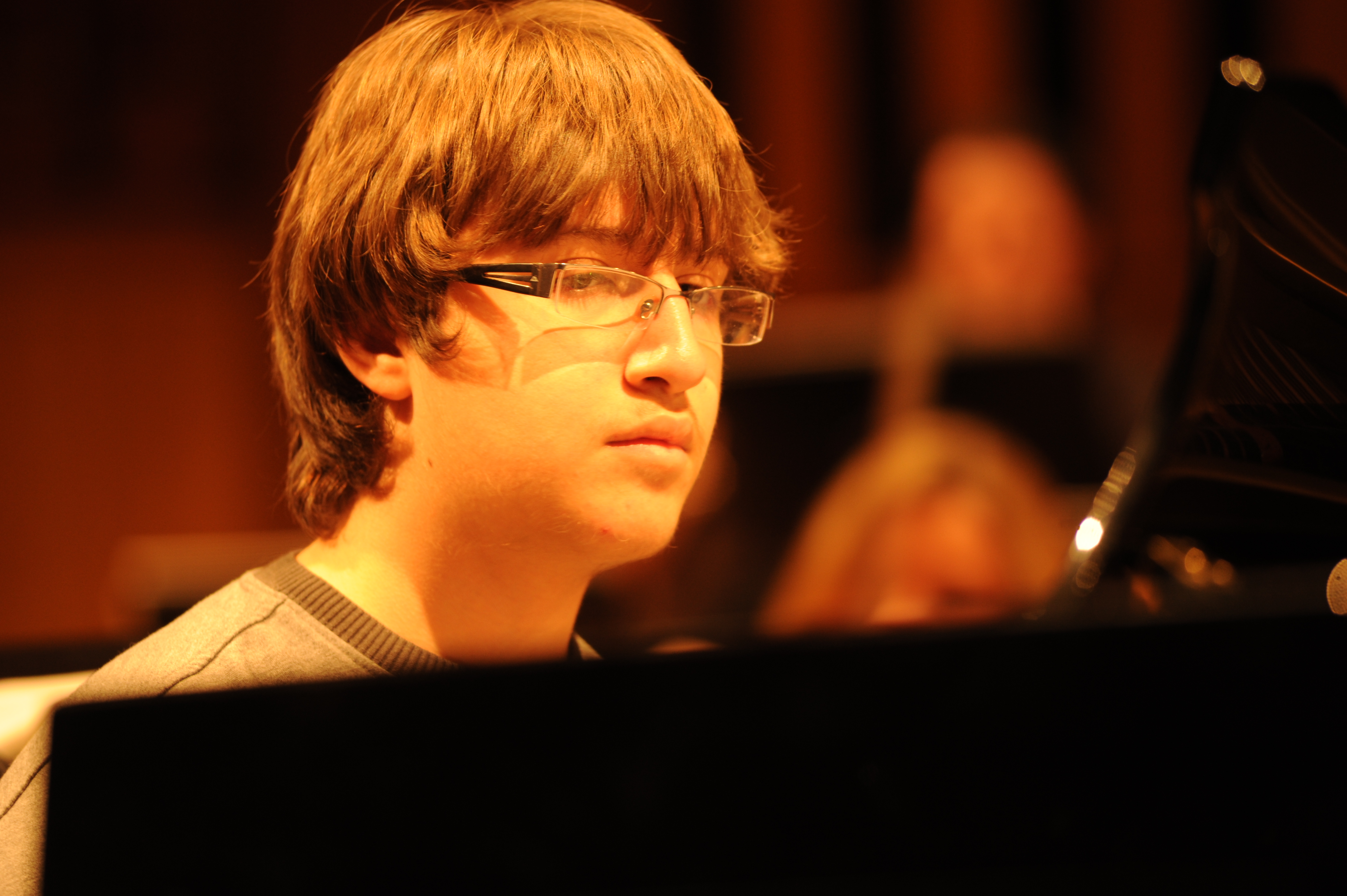
- Mertol Demirelli, 2011
- Born: June 6, 1996 (age 30); Ankara, Turkey
- Known for: Piano child prodigy

Mertol Demirelli (born June 6, 1996, in Ankara) is a Turkish child prodigy pianist.

For up-to-date information; mertoldemirelli.com

== Education ==
He began his music studies when he was four years old, private piano lessons followed when he was five. Displaying noticeable talent at the special admittance examinations, Mertol was accepted to the Bilkent University, Faculty of Music and Performing Arts, Music Preparatory Primary School with full scholarship. He studied piano with Oya Ünler for four years and with Ersin Onay for a year. Mertol also continued his high school education and followed a special program for talented children at this school by taking courses on Music Theory, Ear Training, with Dr. Orhun Orhon, Composition with Dr. Turgut Pöğün, Dr. Orhun Orhon and Dr. Onur Türkmen and Violin with Eda Özer. He was accepted to the Queen Elisabeth Music Chapel(Belgium) in October 2010 with full scholarship and studied piano with Abdel Rahman El Bacha for four years. After October 2014, he studies piano under the direction of Maria-Joāo Pires who invites him to the Partitura Project to share the stage on regular occasions the following year.

== Performances ==
At the age of seven in 2003, he won the IBLA Grand Prize Italy. The price included organization of concerts worldwide. In January 2004, Mertol gave concerts at Newcastle (England) in February 2004, at New York including Carnegie Hall and Arkansas-Little Rock (USA).

Since 2003, he gave concerts at various universities including, Anadolu, Bilkent, Boğaziçi, Hacettepe, Istanbul, Izzet Baysal and Yıldız. Demirelli performed at the Akbank Piano Days, The Mersin International Music Festival, Antalya International Piano Festival as well as special concerts at Turkish National Grand Assembly, Turkish Pediatric Foundation and Vehbi Koç Foundation. He also performed with The Spivakov Genius Children from Russia at Boğaziçi University in 2007.

He attended Gulsin Onay, Muhittin Demiriz, Idil Biret, Edna Golandsky, Dmitri Bashkirov, Jean-Claude Vanden Eynden and Oya Ünler’ s master-classes. He also performed with Fazil Say at his Ayvalık and Antalya International Piano Festival concerts.

He performed W.A. Mozart's Concerto for Piano No.11 when he was eight. At nine, the Piano Concerto No.12, at eleven, the Piano Concerto No.23. When he was ten in 2007, at the opening of 35th International Istanbul Music Festival, he played the J.S. Bach Concerto for Two Pianos, in C minor with İdil Biret at Hagia Eirene Museum. At twelve, he played Mozart Concerto For Two Pianos with Hüseyin Sermet at Istanbul and Beethoven Triple Concerto at Munich. At fourteen, he played at the Belgium premiere of Mozart’ s Violin and Piano Concerto, KV Anh. 56 (315f) in March 2011 at Brussels at Flagey. In September–October 2011, He played Liszt Piano Concerto No. 1 with Cem Mansur and the Youth Philharmonic Orchestra of Turkey at İstanbul and Munich. He has been granted a prize "Young artist of the year, in Germany" during Munich concert. He played Mendelssohn's Concerto for Violin and Piano (Op.17) with Jean-Claude Casadesus and The Sinfonia Varshovia at the opening concert of Queen Elisabeth Musical Voyage 2011 in Istanbul. He played Tchaikovsky Piano Concerto No.1 in October 2013, at the opening of concert season in İstanbul.

In 2004, he played at the special vocations which Prof. Dr. İhsan Doğramaci gave to President of Azerbaijan; Ilham Aliyev, in 2005 the IMF Vice President; Ann Krueger and in 2007 President of Israel; Shimon Peres. In 2005 with the invitation of The Turkish Foreign Ministry he gave concerts in Jordan, in 2008 Lithuania and Switzerland in Geneva at Palais des Nations of UN. He played at the Spivakov Music Festival at Moscow in 2008 and at the Summer of Culture Festival at Bratislava in 2009. He played at Belgium Royal Palace in November 2010. He performed at Vexin Festival in 2012.

Mertol Demirelli has given concerts with orchestras including the Bilkent Symphony Orchestra, Antalya, Bursa, Çukurova, İstanbul State Symphony Orchestras, The Borusan İstanbul Philharmonic, CRR, Eskişehir Municipality, Doğuş Children’ s, Kaunas Symphony, The Royal Chamber Orchestra of Wallonia Orchestras and Presidential Symphony Orchestra. The conductors he collaborated with are Augustin Dumay, Burak Tüzün, Ender Sakpınar, Gürer Aykal, Işın Metin, İbrahim Yazıcı, Kevin Griffiths, Modestas Pitrenas, Oğuzhan Kavruk and Rengim Gökmen.
