= Symphony No. 4 (Enescu) =

Musical work composed by George Enescu

- Unfinished symphony by George Enescu
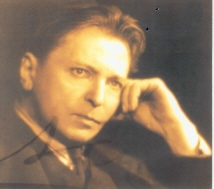
- George Enesco
- Key: E minor
- Composed: 1928–34, completed by Pascal Bentoiu
- Movements: 3

The Symphony No. 4 in E minor is an orchestral composition by the Romanian composer George Enescu, left incomplete at the composer's death, but finished in 1996 by Pascal Bentoiu.

== History ==
Enescu began sketching his Fourth Symphony in 1928, but did not return to it in earnest until after completing the orchestration of his opera Œdipe in 1931. Although he worked on the symphony from 1932, he broke off work in December 1934 after achieving a complete draft and a partial orchestration. He briefly resumed work in the spring of 1939, but it remained incomplete at his death.

Enescu made two orchestrated drafts of the first movement. The first is undated, while the second one, dated 20 October 1934, or possibly 20 December according to Malcolm, also continues the orchestration into the second movement, extending through about the first quarter of it. After having completed Enescu's Fifth Symphony in 1995, Pascal Bentoiu undertook completion of the Fourth as well, and this version was premiered in Bucharest on 2 October 1997 by Cristian Mandeal conducting the George Enescu Philharmonic Orchestra. The UK premiere was given in London on 29 April 2017 by Samuel Draper conducting the Oberon Symphony Orchestra.

== Analysis ==
The symphony has three movements, which are played without pauses in between:

1. Allegro apassionato
2. Un poco andante, marziale
3. Allegro vivace – non troppo

The first movement is in sonata-allegro form, with the exposition presenting the exceptionally economical matter (only five or six melodic elements) that will account for virtually all of the music in the symphony. The main cyclic theme, which will recur in each movement at the same pitch and in the same instrument, first appears in the trumpet at rehearsal number 21. The development section is comparatively short, but this will be compensated by further extensive development in the finale. The recapitulation brings back the two main themes in reverse order. The second theme, originally presented in the solo flute, returns in a blaze of orchestral colour, while the first theme group is represented mainly by what was originally a bridge idea. This first movement, although completed by Enescu, cannot be regarded on its own, nor did the composer conceive it as such. Even in its unfinished form, the second movement (Un poco andante, marziale) follows without interruption and represents, in its thematic character, a continuation of the initial movement

The second movement develops further both of the theme groups from the first movement, in a march character that builds steadily to a climax at rehearsal number 49 and then subsides to a whisper in a solo string quartet, specified by the composer in the short-score sketch. The movement ends inconclusively, with a tremolo in the strings, cymbals, and harp that leads directly into the finale.

The finale is difficult to assign to a definite form. Although there are passages with expository and developmental aspects, its overall function is the recapitulation of all the material from the previous two movements. After a certain point, Enescu turns his attention to breaking up the rhythms within the 3/4 metre, first into twos, then fours, fives, nines, and tens, as well as superimposing them until finally the underlying ternary rhythm is broken and transformed into a binary metre.

== Discography ==
- George Enescu: Symphony No. 4; Symphony No. 5. Orchestra Naţională Radio, Corneliu Dumbrăveanu, cond. (Fourth Symphony, recorded at the studios of Romanian Radio, Bucharest, 1998); Florin Diaconescu, tenor; Orchestra Naţională Radio, Corul de femei Radio (Aurel Grigoraş, choir master); Horia Andreescu, cond. (Fifth Symphony, recorded at the studios of Romanian Radio, Bucharest, 1996). CD recording, 1 disc: analogue, 12 cm, stereo. Casa Radio: Maestro 090. Bucharest: Societatea Română de Radiodifuziuni, 2003. Reissued together with a second disc containing Enescu: Symphony No. 3 and Isis (symphonic poem). Orchestra Naţională Radio, Corul de femei Radio (Aurel Grigoraş, choir master); Horia Andreescu, cond. (Third Symphony, recorded at the studios of Romanian Radio, Bucharest, 1994); Camil Marinescu, cond. (Isis, recorded at the studios of Romanian Radio, Bucharest, 1998). CD recording, 2 discs: digital, 12 cm, stereo. Casa Radio 443 ECR. Bucharest: Radio România, 2017.
- George Enescu: Symphony No. 4; Chamber Symphony, Op. 33; Nuages d'automne sur les forêts. NDR Radiophilharmonie, Peter Ruzicka, cond. CD recording, 1 disc: digital, 12 cm, stereo. CPO 777 966-2. Osnabrück: Classic Produktion Osnabrück, 2015.
