= Ferenc László =

Romanian musicologist and flutist

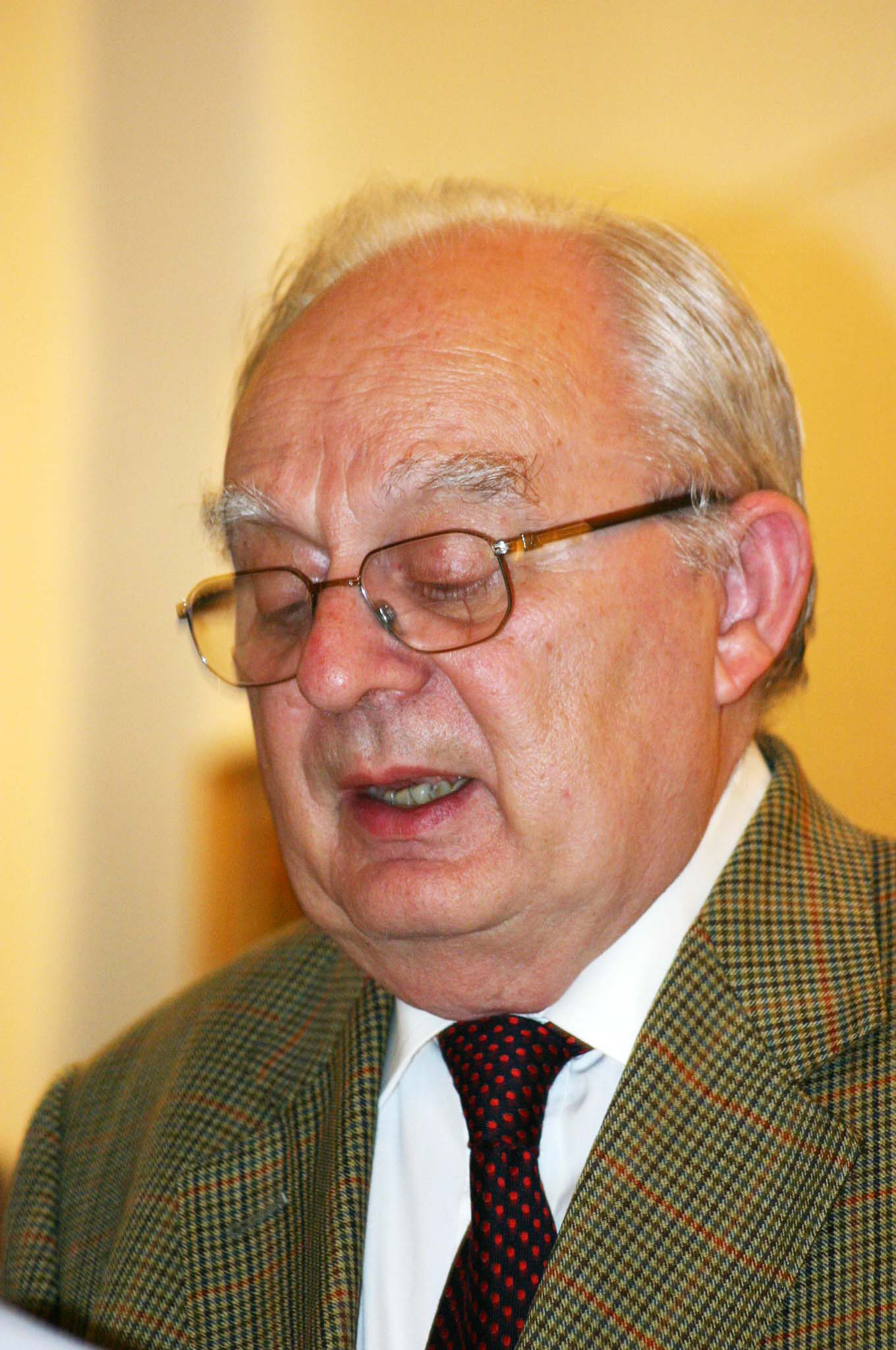
- László in 2010
- Born: May 8, 1937; Cluj
- Died: March 17, 2010; Cluj
- Occupation: musicologist

Ferenc László (May 8, 1937 - March 17, 2010) was a musicologist and flutist.

== Biography ==
Following the completion of his studies in flute at Cluj Conservatory in 1959, he performed as a flutist with the Sibiu State Philharmonic Orchestra until 1965. He then became an instructor of chamber music at the Cluj Music Lyceum, where he served until 1970, and Assistant Professor of Chamber Music at the Bucharest Ciprian Porumbescu Conservatory, where he served until 1991.

Until his retirement in 2008, László taught at the Cluj-Napoca George Dima Conservatory, where he earned a Ph.D. degree in Musicology in 1996.

As a performing artist in communist Romania, László toured Romania and several Eastern European countries (Bulgaria, German Democratic Republic, Soviet Union). He was editor of the music section of A Hét (1970–73), regular contributor to the program in Hungarian language of the Romanian Radio and Television Corporation. He played a major role in the development of a Hungarian program with Electrecord, the Romanian state record company. In 1989, László was co-founder and later President of Romániai Magyar Zene Társaság (Hungarian Musical Society of Romania). In the 1990s, he became founding director of a couple of music societies, namely the Junimea Muzicală din România and the Societatea Română Mozart (Romanian Mozart Society). He served as vice president of the Romanian section of the Paneuropa Union.

He was married to cellist Ilse L. Herbert and had three children (Eva, Peter and Mark).

== Research and writing ==
László’s research covers Romanian and universal musical themes. He was preoccupied with various Mozart-related issues, the relationship between musical culture and folk music culture and Beethoven’s traces in Cluj-Napoca. He was also a scholar of Bartók. His writings have been published by Korunk, Forschungen zur Volks- und Landeskunde, Musik und Kirche, Utunk, Studii de Muzicologie, Művelődés, Brassói Lapok, Secolul 20, Muzica, A Hét as well as Karpatenrundschau. He was an associate of the Budapest-based Magyar Zene.

Many of his publications in three languages study the development of cultural relations among Romanians, Hungarians and Transylvanian Saxons. He was a contributor to volumes like A romániai magyar nemzetiség (Hungarian Ethnicity in Romania), in which he offered a picture of Hungarian musical life in Romania or Zenetudományi Irások (Writings in Musicology), published by Kriterion (1980, 1983), to which he contributed works on the musical aspects of the folkloric and local historical research he conducted during his work.

Most prominent among his publications are his works on Béla Bartók and Zoltán Kodály. He was an editor of several volumes on Bartók, such as 99 Bartók-levél (99 Bartók Letters; 1970), Bartók-könyv 1970-1971 (Bartók Book 1970-1971; 1971), Bartók-dolgozatok (Bartók-Studies; 1974, 1981) and in Romanian, Béla Bartók şi muzica românească (Béla Bartók and Romanian Music; 1976) and two volumes of selected Bartók letters (1976–77). László is an editor of the commemorative Kodály-volume written by Transylvanian authors entitled Utunk Kodályhoz (Our Road to Kodály; 1984), in which he published a study on the Romanian folksong-adaptations of the celebrated Hungarian composer.

=== Book publications ===
- Zenei ügyelet (1976)
- Bartók Béla - Tanulmányok és tanúságok (1980)
- A százegyedik év - Írások Enescuról, Bartókról, Kodályról (1984)
- Béla Bartók (in Romanian; 1985)
- Zenén innen, zenén túl (1987)
- Klavír és koboz (1989)
  - Gen, specie și formă în muzica de flaut a lui J. S. Bach (in Romanian; 1989)
  - Béla Bartók şi lumea noastră: aşa cum a fost (in Romanian;1995)
  - Béla Bartók și muzica populară a românilor din Banat și Transilvania (in Romanian; 2003)

Ferenc László also published as László V. Ferenc and under the pseudonym Vigh Frigyes.
