= Annie Bentoiu =

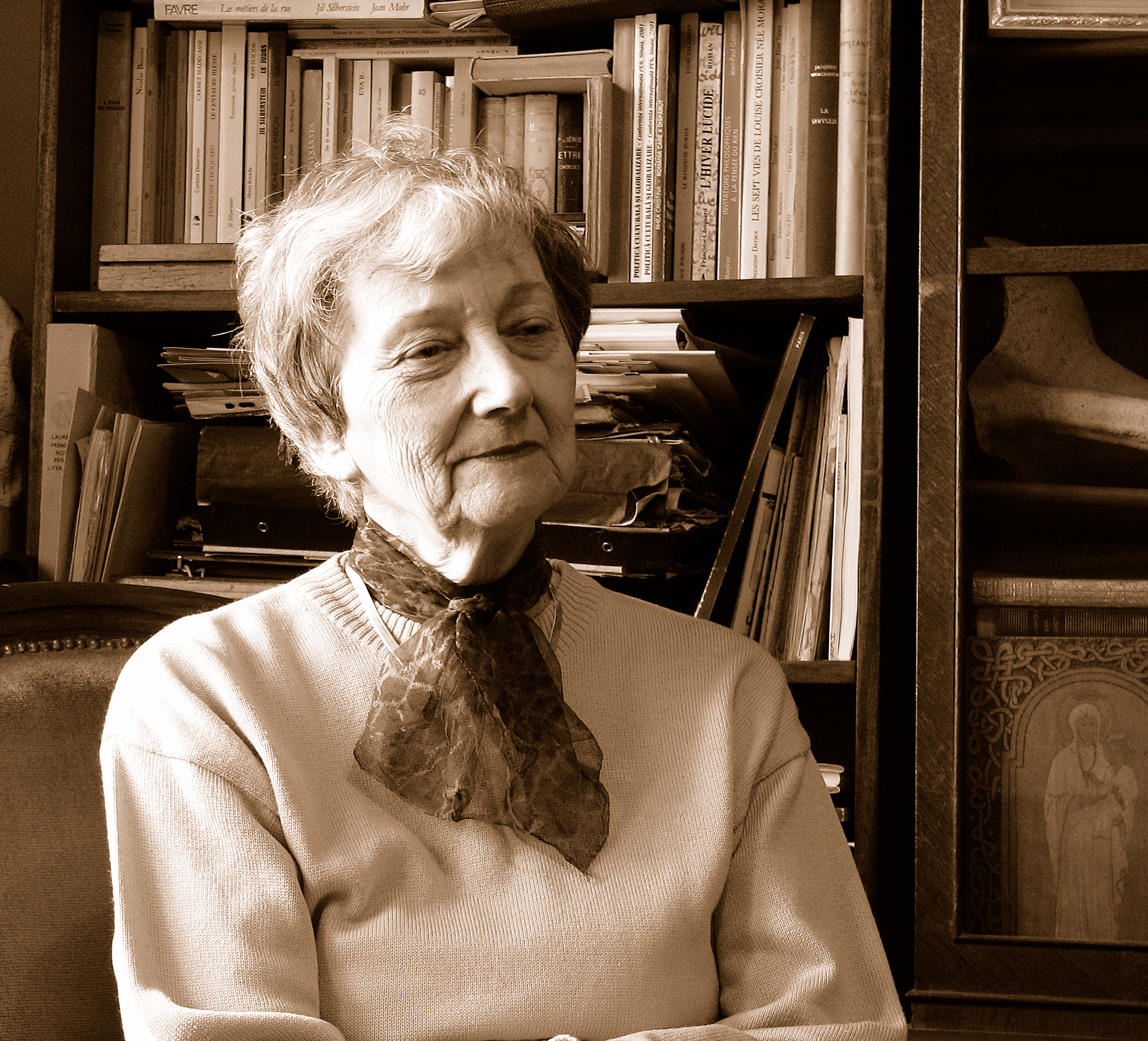
- Born: Annie Deculescu; 1 May 1927; Bucharest, Kingdom of Romania
- Died: 21 December 2015 (aged 88)
- Education: University of Bucharest
- Spouse: Pascal Bentoiu
- Relatives: Constantin Deculescu (father); Violette Bujord (mother)
- Writing career
- Notable work: Translated Romanian literature into French
- Notable awards: Prix de l'Union des Écrivains for her translations (1979, 1983, 1991); National Order of Merit (Romania), Knight rank (2000)

Annie Bentoiu (1 May 1927 – 21 December 2015) was a Romanian-born Swiss writer and translator.

The daughter of Constantin Deculescu, a Romanian doctor and politician, and Violette Bujord, a native of Switzerland, she was born Annie Deculescu in Bucharest and grew up there and in Oltenița. She attended the Central School in Bucharest, going on to study law at the University of Bucharest and literature and history at the Institut français de Roumanie.

In 1949, she married composer Pascal Bentoiu.

She translated Romanian literature into French. She was awarded the Prix de l'Union des Écrivains for her translations in 1979, 1983, and 1991. In 2000, she was awarded the National Order of Merit, Knight rank, by the President of Romania for her work in translating the works of Mihai Eminescu.

== Selected works ==
- Strada Mare novel (in Romanian) (1969) as Adriana Vlad
- Poèmes I/II poetry (in French) (1989)
- Dix méditations sur une rose poetry (in French) (1989)
- Phrases pour la vie quotidienne poetry (in French) (1990)
- Timpul ce ni s-a dat volume 1 memoir (in Romanian) (2000)
- Timpul ce ni s-a dat volume 2 memoir (in Romanian) (2006)
- Voyage en Moldavie (in French) (2001)
- Une liberté désenchantée (in French) (2009)
