= Virgil Mihaiu =

Romanian diplomat and academic

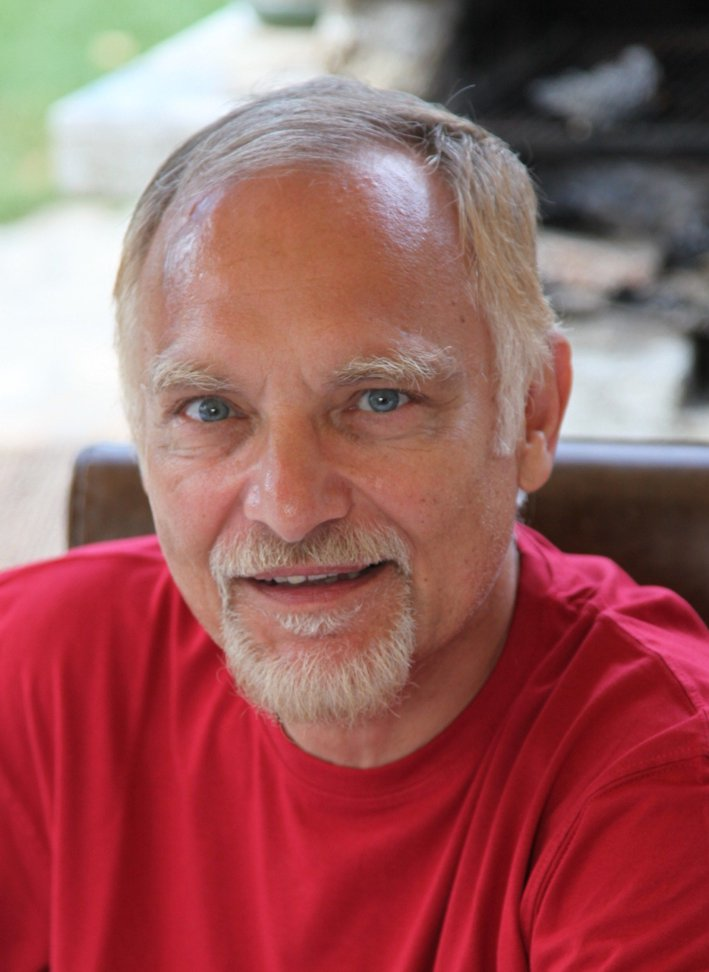
- Virgil Mihaiu
- Born: June 28, 1951 (age 75); Cluj-Napoca, Romania
- Occupations: writer, jazz critic, diplomat, jazz aesthetics professor, polyglot, cultural promoter, performer

Virgil Mihaiu (born June 28, 1951, in Cluj, Romania) is a Romanian writer, jazz critic, diplomat, jazz aesthetics professor, polyglot, and performer. He was co-founder and the first director of the Romanian Cultural Institute in Lisbon, and served as minister-counselor at the Romanian embassy in Portugal. Since 2015 he is director of the Casa do Brasil / Brazilian Cultural Centre, as well as the Biblioteca de Estudios Latinoamericanos, both institutions functioning under the aegis of Cluj's principal University.

== Biography ==
Virgil Mihaiu is the son of Virgil, medical doctor (1915-2002), and Lucreția, music teacher (1925-2012); his brother, Horațiu Mihaiu (b. 1953) is architect, stage designer & theatre director. He is the father of Rafaela Lucreția Mihaiu (b. 1991) and Matei Virgiliu Bindea Mihaiu (b. 2005). In 1974 Virgil Mihaiu graduated from the Faculty of Letters at Babeș-Bolyai University, after studying English and German, as well as Spanish and Portuguese.

Between 1971 and 1983, he was on the editorial staff of Echinox, a cultural magazine. In 1981, he became a member of the Writers' Union of Romania.

Between 1983 and 1993, he was part of the editorial staff of Jazz Forum, the International Jazz Federation's magazine in Warsaw.

He joined the editorial staff of Steaua, the cultural monthly of the Writers’ Union, in 1990.

Mihaiu became an assistant professor at the G. Dima National Music Academy in Cluj in 1992. Five years later, he became a professor of Jazz Aesthetics of the jazz department at G. Dima.

In 2002 he received a Magna cum laude doctorate for his interdisciplinary research on F. Scott Fitzgerald.

In 2006, he co-founded and became the first director of the Romanian Cultural Institute in Lisbon, continuing in the post until 2012. He also served as minister-counselor at the Romanian embassy in Portugal

Mihaiu is an honorary or full member of several organizations, including the United States' Jazz Journalists Association (JJA), a member of the Romanian PEN Club, and an honorary member of the Czech-Romanian Cultural Association based in Prague.

Since 1997, Mihaiu has been a part of the Down Beat Jazz Critics Poll and in 2001 he became the first Central-European ever to be included in the international editorial college of Down Beat, a prominent jazz magazine edited in Chicago.

In 2015 he was co-opted as a master professor at The Centre for Imagination Studies Phantasma within Cluj's UBB University.

Since 2015 Mihaiu is director of the Casa do Brasil / Brazilian Cultural Centre, as well as of the Biblioteca de Estudios Latinoamericanos, both institutions functioning under the aegis of the Babeș-Bolyai University in Cluj.

In over half a century of cultural activity, Mihaiu has marked several priorities: he is the author of the first volume of jazzology essays in Romanian (Resonance Box, 1985); co-editor, together with producer Leo Feigin, of the first Romanian avant-garde jazz albums released in the West – performed by Harry Tavitian, Corneliu Stroe & the Creativ group – on London's Leo Records / 1985–86; founder of the first Jazz Aesthetics Course in the Romanian academic system / at the G. Dima National Music Academy in Cluj, 1997; in 2001 he became the first jazzologist from Central and Eastern Europe to be co-opted in the international editorial college of Down Beat, the global reference monthly published in Chicago. Mihaiu was involved, as co-founding director, in the development of the Romanian Cultural Institute in Lisbon. There he launched cultural diplomacy initiatives, such as: the establishment of the honorary title Amicus Romaniae, meant to highlight the personalities from the Portuguese and international cultural-diplomatic sphere consistently involved in supporting the activities of the Romanian Cultural Institute in Lisbon (2007); the Romanian Music Season in Portugal, held between 2007 and 2012; Romanian Cultural Summer in Portugal; Romanian cinema galas in Lisbon, Porto, Coimbra, Evora, Estoril, Ponta Delgada / Azores Islands, etc.

Co-organizer, advisor, lecturer, moderator of the first Romanian edition of the World Jazz Day / April 30, 2013, Cluj; in 2015, at Mihaiu's initiative, for the first time a higher education institution in Romania – the National Music Academy in Cluj – awarded the title of Doctor Honoris Causa to a jazzologist: John Edward Hasse from the Smithsonian Institution in Washington, D.C.; in 2017 and 2018, Mihaiu was the first scholar to give jazzology lectures at Montenegro's National Academy of Music in Cetinje.

== Writing and lecturing ==
Mihaiu is a prolific author of poems, essays, criticism, and translations. He has been published in Romania's major cultural magazines as well as publications in Portugal, Poland, Great Britain, Germany, Latvia, Switzerland, Russia, Croatia, the United States, France, Brazil, Serbia, Austria, Italy, Norway, Spain, Moldova, Hungary, Costa Rica, Montenegro, Turkey, and Canada.

Mihaiu has delivered Jazzology lectures at various universities and institutes, and participated as a guest in congresses and festivals (Sweden, Portugal, Romania, Croatia, Germany, England, Austria, Spain, Lithuania, Switzerland, Serbia, Scotland, the United States, France, Italy, Montenegro, Moldova, Hungary, Greece, Slovakia, Ireland, Russia, Bulgaria, Turkey, Cuba, Azerbaijan, Northern Macedonia, Belgium).

Between 2000 and 2005 he participated at the F. Scott Fitzgerald World Conferences. He has also given a series of lectures, recitals and documentation tours through universities and cultural institutions of the United States (New York, Philadelphia, Washington DC, San Francisco, Stanford, Boston, Chicago, New Jersey, and Berkeley).

== Performing, media, visual arts ==
Mihaiu is co-founder of Jazzographics, a loose-knit jazz and poetry outfit featuring different combinations of the following artists:

- Alan Tomlinson/trombone (member of London Jazz Composers’ Orchestra)
- Harry Tavitian/piano
- Corneliu Stroe/percussion
- Virgil Mihaiu/poetry, bass-guitar
- Livia Tulbure/choreographic improvisations

He has performed his own poetry as a solo act, or with the Jazzographics, pianists João Paulo Esteves da Silva, Dima Belinski, Lucian Ban, violinist Alexander Balanescu, percussionist Mario Florescu, flutist Marius Gagiu, saxophonist Alex Munte, dancer Fatma Mohamed, and the group Trigon. Mihaiu has performed his poetry in Ireland, Scotland, Romania, England, Austria, USA, Serbia, Germany, Northern Ireland, Hungary, France, Croatia, and at the Lisbon World Exhibition 1998.

Between 1980 and 2004 Mihaiu produced his regular Eseu Jazz broadcast on Radio Cluj and CD Radio Napoca and the Jazzorelief broadcast on TVR Cluj.

=== Guest producer ===
- Guest producer of cultural programmes on Radio Switzerland (Bern, Lugano & Lausanne Studios).
- Contributions to Sveriges Radio AB/Radio Sweden Stockholm, Romanian Radio & TV Bucharest, RTV Cluj, Iasi, Timisoara, BBC / Romanian and Russian Departments, Radio & TV Chișinău, Radio Free Europe/Radio Liberty, (RFE/RL), Sender Freies Berlin, Radio Norway (NRK), Yugoslovenska Televizija, Radio France Internationale, Radiodifusão Portuguesa, Radio Paris-Lisboa, Radio Nova de Porto, Radio Moskva Kultura, Voice of America, Radio Novi Sad, RTP-Antena 1 & 2 Lisbon, RDP-Antena 2 Lisbon, Radio & TV Montenegro, Atlas TV Montenegro, Radio Bulgaria, Deutsche Welle Köln, Radio & TV Azerbaijan, Radio Rossia Moscow, Radio Renascença Lisboa, Televisão SIC Portugal, Scottish BBC Edinburgh, Radio Europa-Lisboa.
- Co-producer/liner-notes author of records issued in Romania, Lithuania, Great Britain, Russia, Germany, France, Switzerland, Moldova
- Author of musical collages for visual essays by architect/stage designer/director Horațiu Mihaiu, staged at theatres in Cluj, Ramnicu-Valcea, Sfantu Gheorghe, Sibiu, Targu-Mures, Piatra Neamt, Targoviste, Deva, and at Hungary's Cultural Centre in Bucharest.

=== Co-author of art documentary-films ===
- The Voice of the Poet / with Radu Țuculescu (TVR Cluj, 1994, 15 min.)
- Paradise Lost in Memory / with Alex Huppert (Vipcom TV Studio, Arad, 1996, 35 min.)
- Sighișoara 2000, with Carmen Cristian (TVR2, 2000, 60 min.)
- Teiuș – Navel of the World, with Carmen Cristian (TVR2, 2000, 60 min.)
- Art-deleni / with Emese Vig (TVR Cultural, 2008, 30 min.)
- Vestuarul / with Andrei Magalie (TVR Cultural, 2009, 30 min.)
- Români fără frontiere / with Corina Ionuț (TVR3, 2010, 30 min.)

== Published works ==
=== Authored ===
- Legea conservarii adolescentei (Law for the Conservation of the Adolescence) / Dacia, Cluj, 1977;
- Sighisoara, Suedia si alte stari de spirit (Sighisoara, Sweden and other States of Mind) / Albatros, Bucharest, 1980;
- Cutia de rezonanta – eseuri despre jazz din perspectiva culturii contemporane (The Resonance Box – Essays on Jazz from the Perspective of Today's Culture) / Albatros, Bucharest 1985;
- Poeme (Poems) / Dacia, Cluj, 1986;
- Jazzorelief / Nemira, Bucharest, 1993, ISBN 973-9144-60-8;
- Paradis pierdut in memorie (Paradise Lost in Memory) / Cartea Romaneasca, Bucharest, 1993, ISBN 973-23-0346-8;
- Incantari & descantari clujene (Canticles & Enchantments of Cluj) / Dacia, Cluj, 1996, ISBN 973-35-0525-0;
- Recensamant de epifanii/Census of Epiphanies – bilingual volume of poetry translated into English by Adam J. Sorkin – Paralela 45, Pitesti, 1999, ISBN 973-593-041-2;
- Jazz Connections in Portugal – conceived and published in English / Alfa Press, Cluj, 2001, ISBN 973-85060-2-6;
- Jazzografii pentru imblanzit saxofoniste (Jazzographies for the Taming of She-Saxophonists) / Dacia, Cluj, 2001, ISBN 973-35-1231-1;
- Between the Jazz Age and Postmodernism: F. Scott Fitzgerald – conceived and published in English / Editura Universitatii de Vest, Timișoara, 2003, ISBN 973-8433-33-9;
- Aur din coama Ariadnei / Gold aus Ariadnes Maehne (Gold from Ariadna's Mane) – bilingual volume of poetry translated into German by Rolf-Frieder Marmont / Limes, Cluj, 2004, ISBN 973-7907-90-6;
- Jazz Connections in Romania – conceived and published in English / Institutul Cultural Roman, Bucharest, 2007, ISBN 978-973-577-531-5;
- Lusoromana punte de vant (Lusoromanian Bridge of Wind) / Brumar, Timișoara, 2010, ISBN 978-973-602-499-3;
- Jazzografías para domar a las saxofonistas (Spanish translation by Cătălina Iliescu Gheorghiu) – El genio maligno, Granada / Spania / 2014, ISBN 978-84-939128-2-6;
- A vers, az élet (Hungarian translation by Beke Sándor) – Erdély Pegazus, Odorheiu Secuiesc / 2020, ISBN 978-606-92070-5-5;
- Blânde jazzografii de Școală Transilvană. Antologie de author 1970-2020 (Mild Transylvanian School Jazzographies. Author's Anthology 1970–2020), Editura Școala Ardeleană, Cluj-Napoca, 2021. ISBN 978-606-797-712-7;
- Jazz Contextele mele. Eseuri (My Jazz Contexts. Essays), Editura Junimea, Iași, 2022. ISBN 978-973-37-2559-6;

=== Co-authored ===
- Russian Jazz New Identity – edited by Leo Feigin / Quartet Books, London, 1985, ISBN 0-7043-2506-3;
- Jazz in Europa – edited by Wolfram Knauer / Darmstaedter Beitraege zur Jazzforschung, Wolke Hofheim/Germany, 1994, ISBN 3-923997-42-6;
- Pentru Gellu Naum (For Gellu Naum) – edited by Iulian Tanase / Vinea & Icare, Bucharest, 2002;
- The Foreign Critical Reputation of F. Scott Fitzgerald – edited by Linda C. Stanley / Praeger, Westport, Connecticut & London 2004;
- Sadovaia 302 bis (Mikhail Bulgakov and Moscow from Today's Perspective) – together with Ruxandra Cesereanu, Marta Petreu, Corin Braga, Ovidiu Pecican, Ion Vartic / Apostrof, Cluj, 2006, ISBN 973-9279-80-5;
- Cartea cu bunici (The Grandparents Book) – edited by Marius Chivu / Humanitas/Bucharest, 2007, ISBN 978-973-50-1828-3;
- A Cidade de Lisboa (The City of Lisbon) – conceived & published in Portuguese – edited by Micaela Ghitescu / Fundatia Culturala Memoria, Bucharest, 2007;
- Clujul din cuvinte (The Cluj of Words) – edited by Irina Petras / Casa Cartii de Stiinta, Cluj, 2008, ISBN 978-973-133-474-5;
- Primii mei blugi (My first Jeans) – edited by Corina Bernic / Art, Bucharest, 2009, ISBN 978-973-124-452-5;
- Sapte decenii de melancolie si literatura (Seven Decades of Melancholy and Literature) – edited by Stefan Borbely / Eikon, Cluj, 2011, ISBN 978-973-757-458-9;
- Promenada scriitorilor / Uniunea Scriitorilor din Romania, Filiala Cluj (The Writers' Promenade / The Writers' Union of Romania, Cluj Department) – edited by Irina Petraș / Eikon, Cluj, 2012, ISBN 978-973-757-607-1;
- Viața literară la Cluj – Eikon, Cluj / 2013, ISBN 978-973-757-825-9;
- Scriitori ai Transilvaniei (Writers of Transylvania) – Eikon, Cluj / 2014, ISBN 978-606-711-182-8;
- The essay entitled Global & Local, Words & Jazz in Today's World, in Jazz in Word: European (Non-)Fiction. Kirsten Krick-Aigner and Marc-Oliver Schuster, Editors. Volume published under the aegis of Vienna University. Königshausen & Neumann / Würzburg / 2017, ISBN 978-3-8260-6341-1;
- Chapter about Romania in The History of European Jazz. Editor: Francesco Martinelli. Equinox Publishing Ltd., Sheffield / U.K. & Bristol, Connecticut / USA / 2018. (Published with the support of the European Jazz Network & funds from Creative Europe). ISBN 978-1-78179-446-3;
- Echinox 50, edited by Ion Pop & Călin Teutișan, Colecția Echinox, under the aegis of the Romanian National Museum of Literature in Bucharest / ed. Școala Ardeleană, Cluj-Napoca / 2018, ISBN 978-606-797-326-6;
- Filiala Cluj a Uniunii Scriitorilor, Almanahul Literar/Steaua 70, 1949-2019, edited by Irina Petraș. Editura Școala Ardeleană, Cluj-Napoca / 2019, ISBN 978-606-797-398-3;
- Amintiri despre Sorin Tudoran, edited by Dorina Rus, ed. Tracus Arte, Bucharest / 2020, ISBN 978-606-023-163-9.

=== Anthologies ===
Virgil Mihaiu has had works included in the following poetry anthologies:

- Jahresring 79-80, German translation by Oskar Pastior / Deutsche-Verlag-Anstalt, Stuttgart, 1980;
- Erkezö szel, Hungarian translation by Tibor Hergyan / Tankönyvkiado, Budapest, 1986;
- Young Poets of a New Romania, translated by Brenda Walker, Forest Books, London & Boston, 1991, ISBN 0-948259-89-2;
- Streiflicht, Eine Auswahl zeitgenössischer rumänischer Lyrik, German translation by Christian W. Schenk, Dionysos Verlag, Kastellaun, 1994, ISBN 3-9803871-1-9;
- Transylvanian Voices, An Anthology of Contemporary Poets from Cluj-Napoca, translated into English by Adam J. Sorkin and Liviu Bleoca, The Romanian Cultural Foundation, Iași, 1994, ISSN 1223-1908;
- Savremenik, Serbian translation by Adam Pusloijc / Apostrof, Belgrade, 1995;
- Transylvanian Voices, anthology by Adam J. Sorkin & Liviu Bleoca, second edition / East European Monographs, Columbia University Press, 1994, The Center for Romanian Studies, Iași, 1997, ISBN 973-98091-4-6, 12 bis;
- Gefährliche Serpentinen, German translation by Dieter Schlesak / Galrev, Berlin, 1998, ISBN 3-933149-01-0;
- Vid tystnadens bord, Swedish translation by Jon Milos / Symposion, Brutus Ostlings Forlag, Stockholm, 1998;
- Day After Night – Twenty Romanian Poets for the Twenty-First Century, edited by Gabriel Stanescu & Adam J. Sorkin / Criterion Publishing, USA, 2000;
- Meet, French translation by Alain Paruit / Maison des ecrivains etrangeres et des traducteurs, St. Nazaire, 2002;
- Cantecul stelelor / Il canto delle stelle, anthology by Aurel Rau & Adrian Popescu; Italian translation by Stefan Damian & Bruno Rombi / Editura Limes, Cluj-Napoca, 2004, ISBN 973-7907-77-9;
- The Poetry of Men's Lives, edited by Fred Moramarco & Al Zolynas, English translation by Adam J. Sorkin / University of Georgia Press, Athens Georgia USA, 2004, ISBN 0-8203-2351-9;
- Mi-ar trebui un sir de ani / It Might Take Me Years, Romanian-English anthology by Constantin Abaluta / PEN Romanian Centre, Casa Cartii de Stiinta, Cluj-Napoca, 2009, ISBN 978-973-565-0;
- Lumina din cuvinte – antologie de Irina Petraș / Ed. Eikon & Școala Ardeleană, Cluj-Napoca / 2015, ISBN 978-606-711-182-8;
- Sexul frumos - antologie de Marian Oprea / Ed. BrumaR, Timișoara / 2015, ISBN 978-606-726-027-4;
- Ladies in Jazz – culegere de Alexandru Șipa, Ed. Tracus Arte, Bucharest / 2016, ISBN 978-606-664-630-7;
- Transilvania din cuvinte – antologie de Irina Petraș / Editura Școala Ardeleană, Cluj-Napoca / 2018, ISBN 978-606-797-299-3;
- Zece dintr-o sută – Cartea sunetelor / Mitologii subiective, vol. 1, Coordonatori: Ioan Big, Radu Lupașcu, Gabriel Petric / ed. Arvin Press, Bucharest / 2018, ISBN 978-973-154-081-8;
- A virág álma – anthology of world literature in Hungarian by Beke Sándor, Fülöp Lajos, Ráduly János / Ed. Erdély Gondolat & Erdély Toll, Odorheiu Secuiesc / 2019, ISBN 978-606-534-098-5;
- Schwebebrücken aus Papier (Paper Suspension Bridges). Anthology of contemporary Romanian poetry. Translated and edited by Hellmut Seiler. Edition Noack & Block, Berlin/2021, ISBN 9783868131116.

== Awards and honors ==
- 1977 – Debut prize for poetry awarded by "Dacia" publishing house (Cluj-Napoca, Romania);
- 1984 – Amicus Poloniae, honorary badge awarded by Poland's Ministry of Culture;
- 1994 – Poetry prize of the Writers’ Association Cluj, Romania;
- 1996 – Poetry Book of the Year, prize at "Salonul național de carte"/National Book Award, Romania;
- 1998 and 2002 – Poetry prize of Romania's Writers’ Union Cluj Section;
- 2001 – Cultural Ambassador of Cluj, honorary title conferred by the Romanian National Opera, Cluj-Napoca and the Transylvanian Business Center;
- 2003 – prize for jazz criticism awarded by the Romanian Radio Broadcasting Corporation;
- 2008 – prize for jazz criticism awarded by the Muzza Cultural Foundation;
- 2009 – Movimento Arte Contemporânea Foundation / Foundation of Contemporary Art (MAC), prize for excellence / Lisbon (Portugal), for promoting international cultural cooperation;
- 2016 − Cluj-Napoca Senior of the City title and diploma, awarded by the District of Cluj Council;
- 2023 – The Book of the Year 2022 Prize (in the Essay section), awarded by the Romanian Writers’ Union, Cluj Branch, for the volume My Jazz Contexts.
