= Toamna Muzicală Clujeană =

Classical music festival

Toamna Muzicală Clujeană (Romanian for Cluj Musical Autumn) is a classical music festival organised since 1965, by the Transylvania Philharmonic in Cluj-Napoca.
