= Symphony No. 5 (Enescu) =

Orchestral composition by George Enescu

- Unfinished orchestral-vocal music by George Enescu
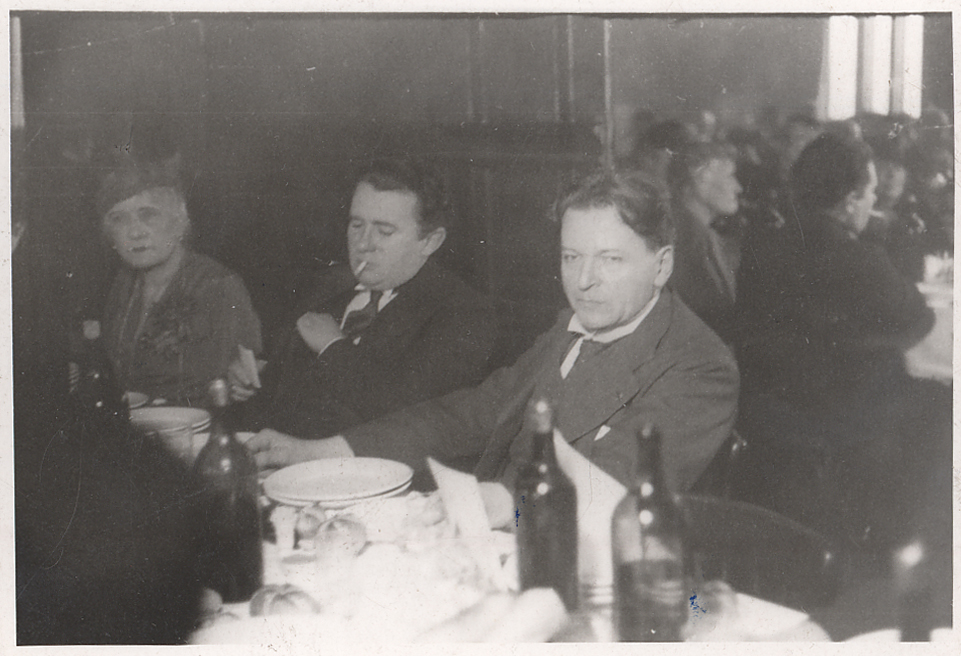
- George Enesco in the 1940s
- Key: D minor
- Text: poem by Mihai Eminescu
- Language: Romanian
- Composed: 1941–1946, completed by Cornel Țăranu and Pascal Bentoiu
- Movements: 4
- Scoring: tenor; women's choir; orchestra

The Symphony No. 5 in D major is a large-scale composition for orchestra, tenor soloist, and female choir by the Romanian composer George Enescu, using a text by the Romanian poet Mihai Eminescu. Drafted in 1941 and partially orchestrated at some later date, the symphony was left unfinished at Enescu's death, but has been completed posthumously, first partially by Cornel Țăranu in 1970–1972 and 1990, then in complete form by Pascal Bentoiu in 1995.

== History ==
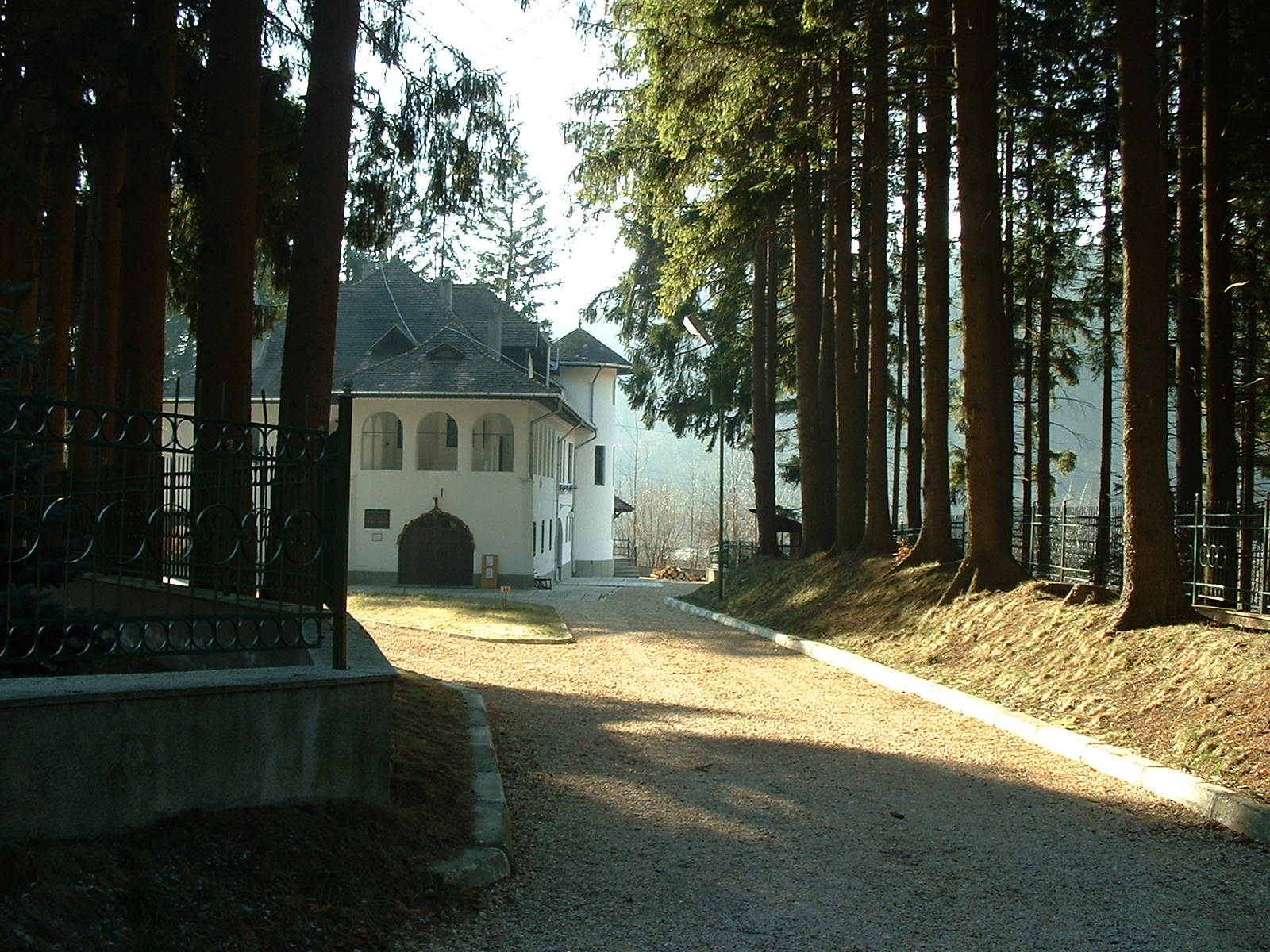
Luminiș, Enescu's villa near Sinaia, where Enescu composed the Fifth Symphony

Although the ideas in it had doubtless been gestating for some time, Enescu began writing the Fifth Symphony during his annual summer break at his villa, Luminiș, in Sinaia in 1941, completing the entire draft in a span of something less than one month. The starting date is unknown, but Enescu might have been prompted to begin the symphony by the outbreak of war in Romania on 22 June. The first movement is dated 1 July in the manuscript and the second movement 8 July. The third movement is undated, but the fourth and final movement of the draft was completed on 19 July. For reasons that are not entirely clear, but must have had something to do with the war, Enescu broke off work at this point. At some later date (perhaps in Romania before September 1946, or later, in Paris), Enescu set about the orchestration, completing twenty-five pages (about two-thirds) of the first movement, up to a culminating chord in the fifth bar of the recapitulation.

The first movement of the Symphony, in the completion by Țăranu, was premiered at the Cluj Musical Autumn in 1972 under the baton of Emil Simon. Encouraged by its reception, Țăranu set about the more difficult task of completing the rest. After finishing a piano-score version, he orchestrated the finale, which was first presented together with the first movement at the Enescu Festival of 1991 in Bucharest, performed by the George Enescu Philharmonic Orchestra under Cristian Mandeal. Although Țăranu had hoped to complete the orchestration of the other two movements as well, he was prevented from doing so and asked Pascal Bentoiu to undertake the task. Realizing that the orchestrational integrity of the whole would otherwise suffer, Bentoiu (with Țăranu's agreement) reworked the entire finale as well as the unfinished third of the first movement, and the completed symphony was finally premiered in Bucharest by the Romanian National Orchestra and Radio Choir, with Florin Diaconescu, tenor soloist, conducted by Horia Andreescu, on the opening concert of the 1996–97 season.

== Analysis ==
The symphony has four movements:

1. Moderato sciolto
2. Andantino moderato piacevole
3. Vivace con fuoco
4. Andante grave

The overall form of the symphony involves, typically for Enescu, a cyclical metamorphosis of thematic "characters", setting out from a definitively shaped but spontaneous block of sonorities. It involves a broadening of the concept of cyclic form, however, in that the allocation of roles for the various themes is constantly changing, in a sort of perpetual variational thinking. The main theme of the first movement, for example, will become a secondary theme in the finale. Similarly, the internal arrangement of elements within each theme group also changes with every recurrence.

=== I. Moderato sciolto ===
The first movement is written in a free sonata-allegro form. The first thematic group is striking for the breadth of its melodic content, which is not usual for any symphony, and is not found in Enescu's previous four essays in the form. Within the composer's catalogue, it is necessary to go back to the String Octet (1900) or the "Prélude a l'unison" from the Second Orchestral Suite (1915) to find a comparable treatment. This theme group extends for twelve pages of orchestral score, up until the solo violin enters at rehearsal-number 7, marked dolente. At first, this seems to be just a bridge, but proves to be the most important element of the second thematic group.

This second group, in contrast to the first, presents a small number of well-defined motifs and phrases, and continues for only four pages of score, to the beginning of the development section at rehearsal number 11. The treatment of the exposition materials is one of "characters in the making"—figures and motives that will evolve over the remainder of the entire symphony. The tumultuous development section reaches its climax after five bars of the recapitulation are already under way. It is at this point that Enescu's completed orchestration ceases, and what follows is surprisingly compressed, reaching the second thematic group after only sixteen bars. The composer's intention seems to have been to create in the first movement only a summary of what is to follow in the rest of the symphony, with anticipations in place of the expected resolutions.

The movement concludes with an announcement of a new theme, which will become the opening theme of the second movement, at exactly the same pitch—a device that Enescu used frequently, ever since the Octet and the First Orchestral Suite. He will do exactly the same thing at the junction of the third and fourth movements.

=== II. Andantino moderato piacevole ===
The second movement is in Enescu's mature rhapsodic style. It opens with a long viola solo, recalling the modal sound world of the composer's nearly contemporaneous Opp. 27 and 28: the Third Orchestral Suite (Villageoise) and the Impressions d'enfance for violin and piano. After a repetition by the oboe, accompanied by other woodwinds, the viola returns, accompanied in an improvisational, lăutărească style. (The scoring here is indicated scrupulously by the composer in the draft score.) The chromatic/neoromantic musical language gives way here to a fluid modal world that passes easily from one finalis to another, with accompanying pedals, shifting isons, quartal-quintal chords and secundal harmonies, as well as locally "displaced" chords.

Structurally, the movement is extremely free, beginning with a series of thematic expositions in an A B A' B' C D sequence, then continuing from rehearsal 32 with only the material already presented up to that point. Although recapitulation is occasionally suggested, the only real recapitulation occurs with the return of the solo viola's unmistakably Romanian theme three bars after rehearsal number 46.

=== III. Vivace con fuoco ===
The third movement is a scherzo, written in 2/2 time with an inner pulsation of triplets. The thematic material is drawn entirely from the first movement, especially from the second part of the first thematic group. After a dense opening passage, the texture gradually thins out, eventually giving way to a sort of chorale (taking the place of the conventional trio section), though with continuing bursts from the first theme. This central section closes in a "triumphal" quality, with suggestions of the secondary thematic group from the first movement.

This scherzo is the only real allegro movement of the symphony and may be regarded as a redevelopment of the material from the first movement, along the lines of Arnold Schoenberg's procedure in his First Chamber Symphony. The movement is extremely modulatory. At rehearsal number 65, the theme from the first movement's second group, originally dolente in the solo violin, now enters forcefully, and the momentum is broken. Four bars after rehearsal 68, the movement closes with two statements of the subject that will launch the finale.

=== IV. Andante grave ===
The finale is an extended cantata for tenor solo, female choir, and orchestra, using as text an early variant of the poem "Mai am un singur dor" (I Have but One Desire) by Mihai Eminescu. Its overall form, in outline, is.

- Fugato – stretto – pedal
- Recapitulative development of material from all the preceding movements
- Cantata – final coda

The subject of the opening fugato is derived from that dolente theme from the solo violin in the first movement. Here it is assigned (by the composer himself in the sketch) to the brass. The effect is funereal (in his edition, Bentoiu has taken the liberty of adding to the tempo marking, in brackets, "Quasi marcia funebre"), implacable, rigid, and magnificent. The section comes to an end with the main theme from the second movement, "almost as if we were invited to read a name on a wooden cross".

== Text ==
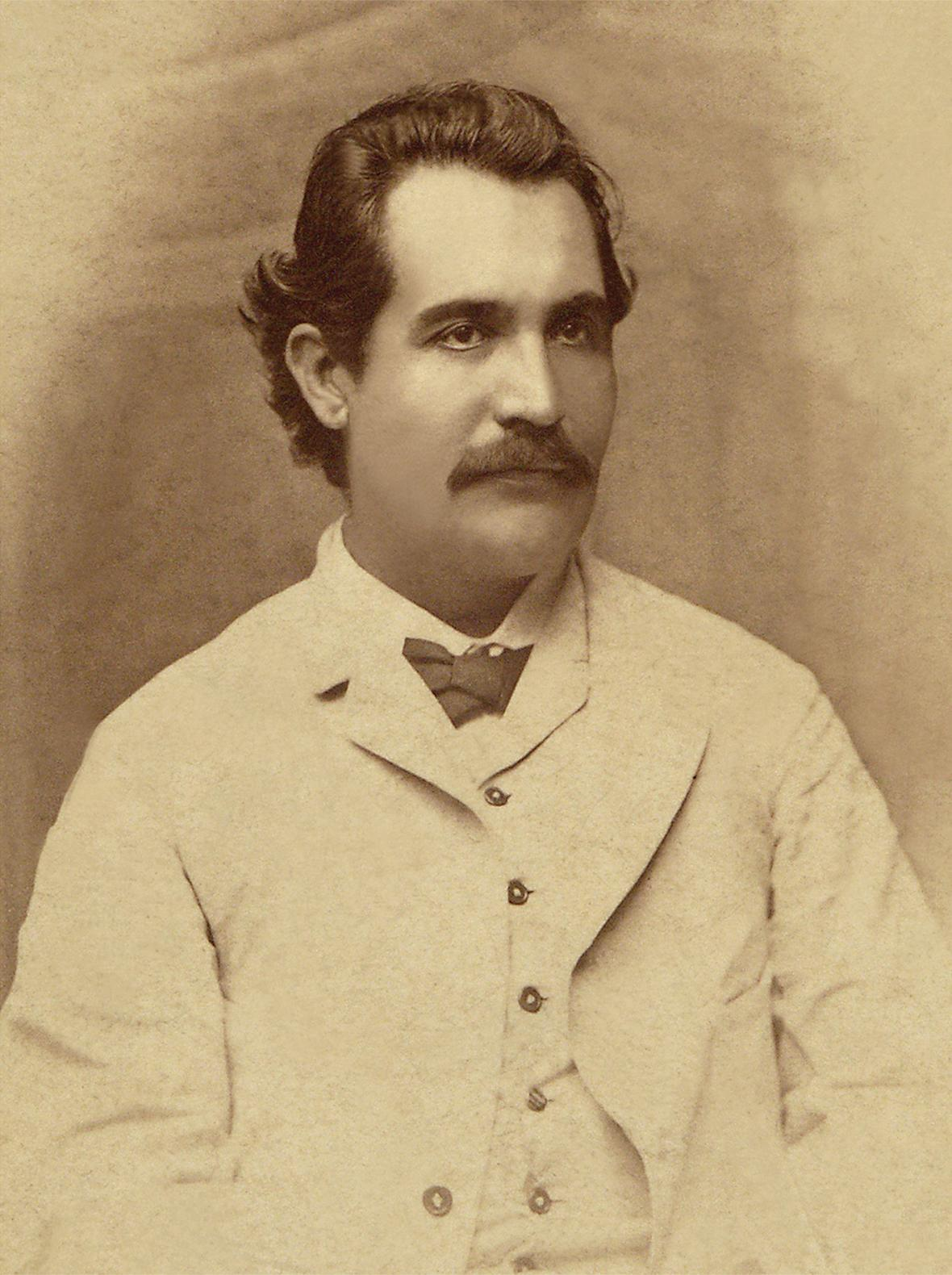
Eminescu in 1884

The text used in the last movement of the symphony does not quite correspond to any of the four "official" versions of Eminescu's poem, but is based on an early variant beginning with the words "De-oi adormi curând / În noaptea uitării / Să mă duceți tăcând, / La marginea mării" (When soon I'm laid to rest / in the quiet evening / bring me silently / to the seashore). Eminescu's variant has nine stanzas, but for the symphony, Enescu has added an extra one in the penultimate position. It is taken from the final version, but with the last two lines exchanged in order to match the abab rhyme scheme of the earlier variant: "Luceferi ce răsar / Din umbră de cetini / O să-mi zâmbească iar / Fiindu-mi prieteni" (Rising evening stars / from the shadow of the branches / will smile on me again / having been my friends).

== Discography ==
- George Enescu: Symphony No. 5; Romanian Rhapsody, Op. 11, No. 1 in A Major; Romanian Rhapsody, Op. 11, No. 2 in D Major. Florin Diaconescu, tenor; Corul de femei Radio (Aurel Grigoraș, chorus master); Orchestra Națională Radio, Horia Andreescu cond. Recorded at the Sala de Concerte Radio during the 1998 George Enescu Festival, Bucharest. CD recording, 1 disc: digital, 12 cm, stereo. Radio România 001. Bucharest: Societatea Română de Radiodifuziune, 1998.
  - reissued in a different coupling, as: George Enescu: Symphony No. 4; Symphony No. 5. Orchestra Națională Radio, Corneliu Dumbrăveanu, cond. (Fourth Symphony); Florin Diaconescu, tenor; Orchestra Națională Radio, Corul de femei Radio (Aurel Grigoraș, choir master) Horia Andreescu, cond. (Fifth Symphony). CD recording, 1 disc: analogue, 12 cm, stereo. Casa Radio: Maestro 090. Bucharest: Societatea Română de Radiodifuziuni, 2003. This version reissued together with a second disc containing Enescu: Symphony No. 3 and Isis (symphonic poem). Orchestra Națională Radio, Corul de femei Radio (Aurel Grigoraș, choir master); Horia Andreescu, cond. (Third Symphony, recorded at the studios of Romanian Radio, Bucharest, 1994); Camil Marinescu, cond. (Isis, recorded at the studios of Romanian Radio, Bucharest, 1998). CD recording, 2 discs: digital, 12 cm, stereo. Casa Radio 443 ECR. Bucharest: Radio România, 2017.
- George Enescu: Isis; Symphony No. 5. Marius Vlad, tenor; NDR Chor; Deutsche Radio Philharmonie Saarbrücken/Kaiserslautern, Peter Ruzicka, cond. CD recording, 1 disc: digital, 12 cm, stereo. CPO 777 823-2. Osnabrück: Classic Produktion Osnabrück, 2012.
