= Sevda-Cenap And Music Foundation =

Music foundation in Turkey

Sevda-Cenap And Music Foundation (SCA, Turkish: Sevda Cenap And Muzik Vakfı) is a music foundation in Turkey.

The foundation was established in 1973 in Ankara by Cevza and Cenap And. In addition to various projects, beginning by 1984 the foundation organizes the Ankara International Music Festival.

== History ==
Cenap And (1894–1982) was a civil engineer. He was married to Sevda Tunalı (1902–1958). The couple established the winery Kavaklıdere in the Kavaklıdere district of the city of Ankara. Beginning in the 1940s, they developed a strong interest in music and, together with prominent musicians of the period such as composer Ahmed Adnan Saygun, writer, essayist, translator and film producer Sabahattin Eyüboğlu and poet, author, politician and diplomat Yahya Kemal Beyatlı founded a club called Ses Tel Birliği Cemiyeti (“Union of Voice and String”).

Following the death of his wife Sevda in a traffic accident in 1958, Cenap And married Cevza Başman (1919–1988) in 1968. In 1973, they founded the Sevda Cenap And Music Foundation. The main mission of the Foundation is the furthering and development of the Western Classical music culture and its education, and the promotion of Turkish and non-Turkish musical works in the Republic of Türkiye. After the death of its founder Cenap And in 1982, his wife Cevza And continued as president of the foundation until her own death in 1988. Following her death, her brother Mehmet Başman became the president of the foundation until his death in 2016.
