= Sibiu Philharmonic Orchestra =

The State Philharmonic Orchestra of Sibiu (Romanian: Filarmonica de Stat Sibiu) is an orchestra from Romania.

== History ==
In the 16th century, Sibiu had one of the first European schools for organ, funded by Hyeronymus Ostermayer and the city's archive contains music scores signed by composers of the 17th and 18th centuries. In 1774, at the court of Samuel von Brukenthal, governor of Transylvania, a professional orchestra held its first concert. In 1792, one year after Mozart’s death, Die Entführung aus dem Serail was played in Sibiu, and later in 1800, The Creation, by Joseph Haydn.

The State Philharmonic of Sibiu was founded on January 1, 1949. Together with the orchestra, artists from Romania and other countries have performed, among them: Ion Voicu, Valentin Gheorghiu, Ștefan Ruha, Monique de La Bruchollerie and Jean Jaques Thiollier, Sviatoslav Richter, Rudolf Kerer, Lazar Berman, Dimitri Bashkirov, Ivry Gitlis, and Montserrat Caballé.

In 2004, the location of the State Philharmonic of Sibiu was moved to Thalia Hall. Built in 1787 by Martin Hochmeister, the hall has been twice destroyed by fire during its history. The County Council of Sibiu restarted the restoration of the building in 1990. The official inauguration took place on October 7, 2004, with the music of the Symphony no. 9 by Ludwig van Beethoven.

== The Orchestra today ==
=== Conductors ===
Past Henry Selbing Petre Sbarcea (1977-2014) Gabriel Bebeșelea (2014-2017)

Current Vacant

=== The Orchestra ===
The orchestra currently consists of:

Piano: Monica Florescu

Cello: Makcim Fernandez Samodaiev, Alexandru Titus Tincu, Anca Demian, Claudia Grelus, Ina Turoiu, Zach Viorica, Silviu Chiorlise

1st violin: Marius Radu - concert master, Sergiu Fidiles - concert master, Lilia Radu, Ilia Rusnac, Vasile Șulț, Ludmila Lungu, Raluca Sfîriac, Daniel Bădăruță, Irina Dancu, Cotîrlea Iuliana, Ioan Andrei Moldovan, Ștefana Zaharia, Teodorian Popa

2nd violin: Elena Borz, Mihai Andrițcu, Ionuț Cristian Bugnar, Mădălina Tătărușanu, Eduard Dascaliuc, timea Gaudi, Costin Urlăeanu, Ioana Gavrilas, Andreea Baicu

Viola: Gabriel Silișteanu, Alina Stavăr, Aurelia Mailat, Mihaela Scheau, Terez Mihály, Tiberiu Maniu, Ioana Șulț

Double Bass: Valentin Desaga, Chirila Adam, Bartha Robert

Flute: Oana Florentina Bădescu, Cozmin Demian, Coste Carina Maria

Oboe: Lucia Dobri, Romanino Lucian Popa, Oana Cristina Avram

Clarinet: Florin Grelus, Ciprian Dancu

Bassoon: Adam Raduly, Mircea Ittu, Ovidiu Borz

Horn: Antonio Mihail, Barta Tivadar, Alin Roman

Trumpet: Medve Sandor, Dorin Petcu, Dumitru Trocin

Trombone: Ion Palagniuc, Radu Munteanu, Emanuel Dombi

Tuba: Daniel Luca

Percussion: Andrei Marcovici, Alexandru Craciun

Harp: Ileana Rotaru
