= Hüseyin Sermet =

Turkish pianist and composer (born 1955)

Hüseyin Sermet (born in Istanbul, 1955) is a Turkish pianist and composer. He is a Doctor Honoris Causa by the Boğaziçi (1988) and Marmara (1998) universities, and was named a State Artist in 1991. He is Co-President of ADAP (Association of Artists for Peace), based in Paris.

Record of piano prizes, incomplete
Year	Competition	Prize	1st prize winner	Ex-aequo with...
1976	(Spain) Paloma O'Shea, Santander	1st prize		
1980	(Italy) Ferruccio Busoni, Bolzano	4th prize	1st prize void	(Italy) Giovanni Umberto Battel
1981	(Spain) Premio de Jaén	1st prize		
1981	(Italy) Ettore Pozzoli, Seregno	1st prize		
1981	(Spain) José Iturbi, Valencia	3rd Prize	(Poland) Elza Kolodin.	
1983	(Italy) Paolo Neglia, Enna	1st prize		
1983	(Belgium) Queen Elisabeth, Brussels	Finalist	(France) Pierre-Alain Volondat	
1985	(Switzerland) Géza Anda, Zürich	2nd prize	1st prize void	(Japan) Yukino Fujiwara
