= Pascal Bentoiu =

Romanian composer (1927–2016)

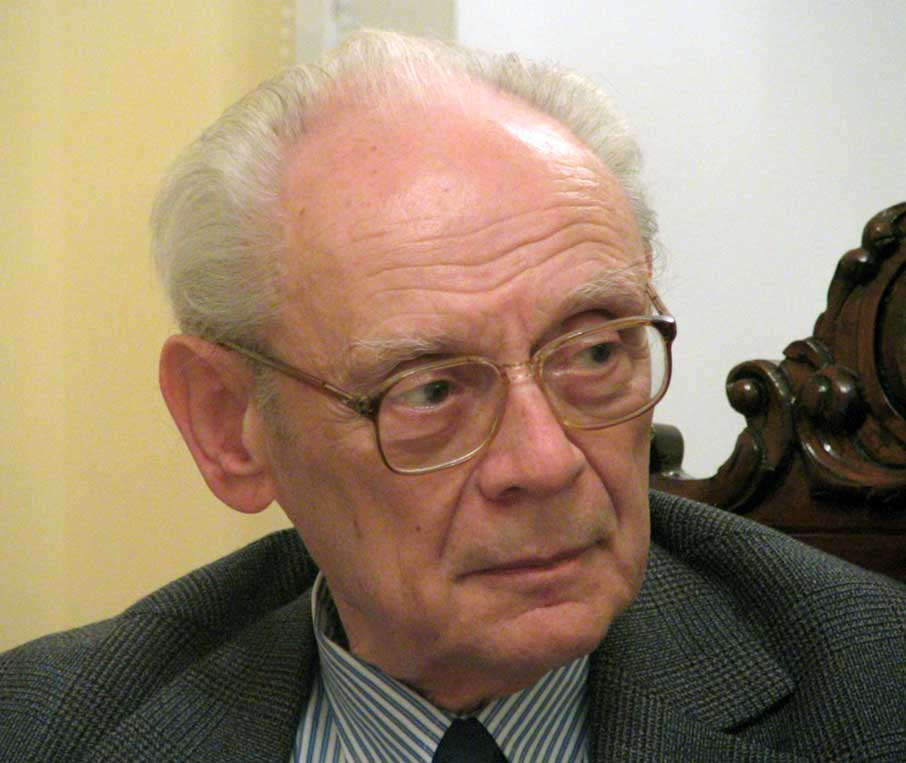
Image of Pascal Bentoiu

Pascal Bentoiu (22 April 1927 – 21 February 2016) was a Romanian modernist composer.

== Life and career ==
Bentoiu studied harmony, counterpoint and composition with Mihail Jora and piano with Theophil Demetriescu. He spent three years researching the rhythm and harmony of Romanian folk music at the Bucharest Folklore Institute and then began composing for the stage. His operas are written with dramatic flair and make use of a variety of elements, including folksong, tape, serialism and diatonic qualities. His instrumental and orchestral works also contain a variety of contemporary techniques, and Bentoiu's work is characterized by its color and lyricism.

He has edited the sketches of the Fourth (1934) and Fifth (1941) Symphonies of Georges Enescu into shape for performance. (There is a recording of both realizations from a 1998 festival.)

In 1949, he married Annie Deculescu.

Bentoiu died in Bucharest on 21 February 2016 at the age of 88.

== Compositions ==
=== Orchestral ===
- Symphony nr. 1, op.16 (1965)
- Symphony nr. 2, op.20 (1974)
- Symphony nr. 3, op.22 (1976)
- Symphony nr. 4, op.25 (1978)
- Symphony nr. 5, op.26 (1979)
- Symphony nr. 6 "Culori”, op.28 (1985)
- Symphony nr. 7 "Volume”, op.29 (1986)
- Symphony nr. 8 "Imagini”, op.30 (1987)
- "Eminesciana III", Orchestra Concerto, op. 23 (1976)
- Symphonic Poem "Luceafărul”, op. 7, on Mihai Eminescu (1957)
- Symphonic Suite "Images from Bucharest”, op. 10 (1959)
- "Ardelenească" Suite, op. 6 (1955)
- Concert Ouverture, op. 2 (1948)
- Piano Concerto nr. 1, op. 5 (1954)
- Piano Concerto nr. 2, op. 12 (1960)
- Violin Concerto, op. 9 (1958)
- Cello Concerto, op. 31 (1989)

=== Theatre ===
- Nunta lui Figaro (Beaumarchais)
- Fântâna Blanduziei (Alecsandri)
- Femeia îndărătnică (Shakespeare); de același author Doi domni din Verona, Romeo și Julieta, Poveste de iarnă, Hamlet, Visul unei nopți de vară

precum și pentru alte piese, de alți autori (Eschil, Euripide, Camus, Rostand ș.a.)

=== Chamber music ===
- Piano Sonata, op. 1 (1947, rev. in 1957)
- Piano and Violin Sonata op. 14 (1962)
- String Quartet nr. 1, op. 3 (1953)
- String Quartet nr. 2 „al consonanțelor”, op. 19, (1973)
- String Quartet nr. 3, op. 27a (1981)
- String Quartet nr. 4, op. 27b (1981)
- String Quartet nr. 5, op. 27c (1982)
- String Quartet nr. 6, op. 27d (1982)

=== Songs ===
- „Patru cântece pe versuri de Șt.O. Iosif”, op. 4 (1953)
- Trei sonete (Mihai Eminescu), op. 8 (1958)
- Cinci cântece (Nina Cassian), op. 11 (1959)
- Patru cântece (Mihai Beniuc), op. 13 (1961)
- „Flăcări negre” (Alexandru Miran), op. 21 (1974)
- „Incandescențe” (Alexandru Miran), op. 24 (1977)
- „Gelozie” (George Topîrceanu)

== Writings ==
- Imagine și sens (1971, ed. 2/1973, French version 1979)
- Deschideri spre lumea muzicii (1973)
- Gândirea muzicală (1975)
- Capodopere enesciene (1984), English translation by Lory Wallfisch, as Masterworks of George Enescu: A Detailed Analysis (2010)
- Breviar enescian (2005)
- Opt simfonii și un poem (2007)
