= Christian Badea =

Romanian conductor

- Born: December 10, 1947 (age 77); Bucharest, Romania
- Occupation: Conductor

Christian Badea (né Cristian Badea) is a Romanian-American opera and symphonic conductor.

A native of Bucharest, Romania, Badea's early training was as a classical violinist in Bucharest and Brussels. He later studied conducting at the Juilliard School of Music in New York.

After winning the Rupert Conducting Competition in London (1976) he is invited by Gian Carlo Menotti to conduct at the Festival Of The Two Worlds at Spoleto and right after he is appointed musical director of the Italian edition of the festival, and later on in a similar position for the American edition. In the next decade he conducts at Spoleto and at Charleston a series of operas which will establish him a reputation: Menotti's Maria Golovin, The Last Savage and The Saint of Bleecker Street, and also Shostakovich's Lady Macbeth from Mtsensk and Samuel Barber's Antony and Cleopatra to great acclaim. His recording of Samuel Barber's opera Antony and Cleopatra received a Grammy in 1985.

In 1983 he is appointed artistic director of the Columbus Symphony Orchestra, in Columbus, Ohio. During his nine-year tenure here he records two discs with the music of Roger Sessions and Peter Mennin praised by the musical critics.

He debuts with The Metropolitan Opera in New York on tour at Boston in 1986 conducting Tosca with Grace Bumbry. During the next decade, until 1995, Christian Badea performed as conductor for 167 times, in a repertoire including: Tosca, Aida, La traviata, Cavalleria rusticana, Pagliacci, Boris Godunov, La bohème, Don Giovanni, La fanciulla del West, Madama Butterfly, Rigoletto. In 1990 he conducted the Metropolitan Gala opening the season with La bohème, the cast including Plácido Domingo and Mirella Freni.

At Wiener Staatsoper he performed as a conductor for 19 times between 1992 and 1995 in operas like Tosca, Aida, Le contes d'Hoffmann, Otello and La bohème. The most notable of these was the premiere of Les contes d'Hoffmann in 1993, staged by Andrei Șerban and with a cast including Plácido Domingo, Natalie Dessay, Barbara Frittoli and Bryn Terfel.

He is regularly invited to the Royal Opera House of Covent Garden with 32 appearances as conductor in La bohème, Tosca and Turandot.

His opera career includes performances at Opéra de Lyon, Théâtre Royal de la Monnaie in Brussels, Dutch National Opera in Amsterdam, English National Opera, Royal Opera Copenhagen, Royal Opera Stockholm, Opera Australia, Arena di Verona, Teatro Colón in Buenos Aires, Budapest State Opera.

In 2006 he starts to conduct in Romania, notably with the George Enescu Philharmonic Orchestra at the Romanian Athaeneum, one of the most notable moments being a semi staged concert of Parsifal, in the double role of conductor and stage director. In 2009 he opened the George Enescu Festival in Bucharest with Haga Philharmonic Orchestra.

As an orchestral conductor, Badea has performed in concert halls throughout Europe, North America, and Asia: Carnegie Hall (New York), Suntory Hall (Tokyo), Salle Pleyel (Paris), Concertgebouw (Amsterdam), conducting ensembles like Royal Philharmonic, BBC Symphony, Gothenburg Symphony, Czech Philharmonic, Sankt Petersburg Philharmonic Orchestra, Residentie Orchestra, Amsterdam Philharmonic, Orchestre Philharmonique de Radio France, Orchestre Nationale de Lyon, Accademia di Santa Cecilia Orchestra (Roma), RAI Orchestra (Torino), Maggio Musicale Orchestra (Florence), Gulbenkian Orchestra (Lisabona) or Orquesta Nacional de España, among others.
