= Ruxandra Donose =

Romanian operatic mezzo-soprano

- Born: 2 September 1964 (age 61); Bucharest, Romanian People's Republic
- Occupation: Operatic mezzo-soprano
- Years active: 1990–present
- Organisation: Vienna State Opera
- Website: www.ruxandradonose.com

Ruxandra Donose (born 2 September 1964, in Bucharest) is a Romanian operatic mezzo-soprano.

Donose studied singing with Georgeta Stoleriu at the Ciprian Porumbescu Conservatory, where she graduated in 1989.

In 1990 she was the runner up at the ARD International Music Competition. After this, she had her first engagement abroad, in Basel. In 1992 she became a member of the Vienna State Opera. From there, she developed a fast-paced international career, as an opera singer (Covent Garden, Opéra Bastille, Metropolitan Opera, Salzburg Festival etc.) and also as an interpreter for Lied and oratorio.

Donose is considered a distinguished bel canto singer, but also one of the leading interpreters of the French and the Mozartian mezzo-soprano repertoire.

About her live recording with Rossini's La cenerentola, in the title role, at Glyndebourne festival 2005, Barry Brenesal notes: "However, I will single out only Ruxandra Donose for praise. Hers is a dusky mezzo, even in coloration, volume, and support across the registers. The voice is able to handle exacting coloratura without any aspiration or evidence of strain. Her forthright, focused attack in her final aria ("Non più mesta") brought memories of Marilyn Horne in the 1970s; and like Horne, Donose builds her part from the text, not by working around it." (from Fanfare Magazine)

== Discography ==
- 2008:Rossini: La Cenerentola / Jurowski, Donose, Glyndebourne Festival (Blu-ray), Label: Opus Arte.
- 2007:Ruxandra Donose: The Songs of Nicolae Bretan, Vol. I, MP3 Album
