= George Enescu Philharmonic Orchestra =

Romanian orchestra in Bucharest

- Orchestra
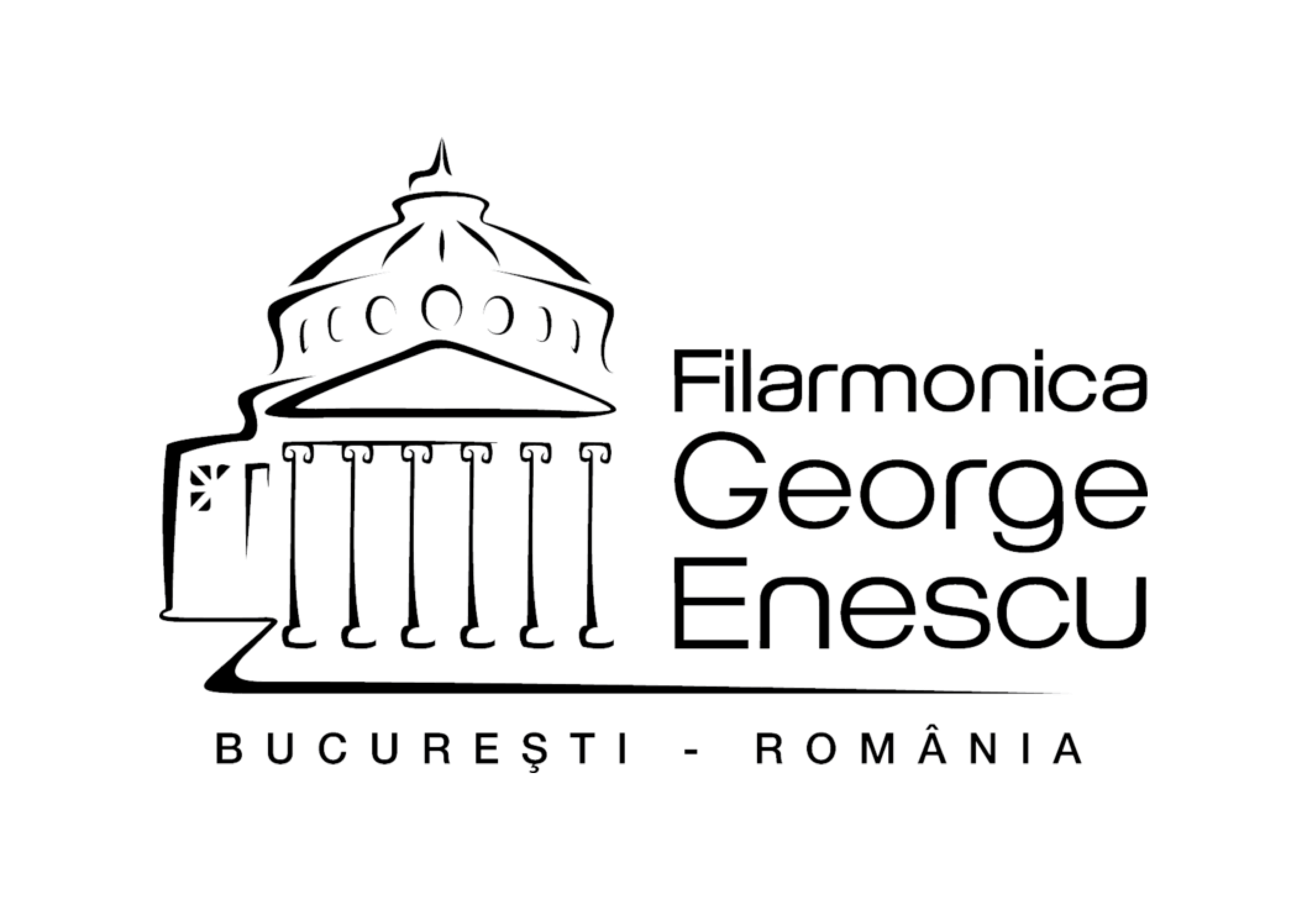
- Native name: Filarmonica "George Enescu"
- Founded: 1868
- Concert hall: Romanian Athenaeum
- Principal conductor: Robert Treviño (designate, effective autumn 2026)
- Website: Official website

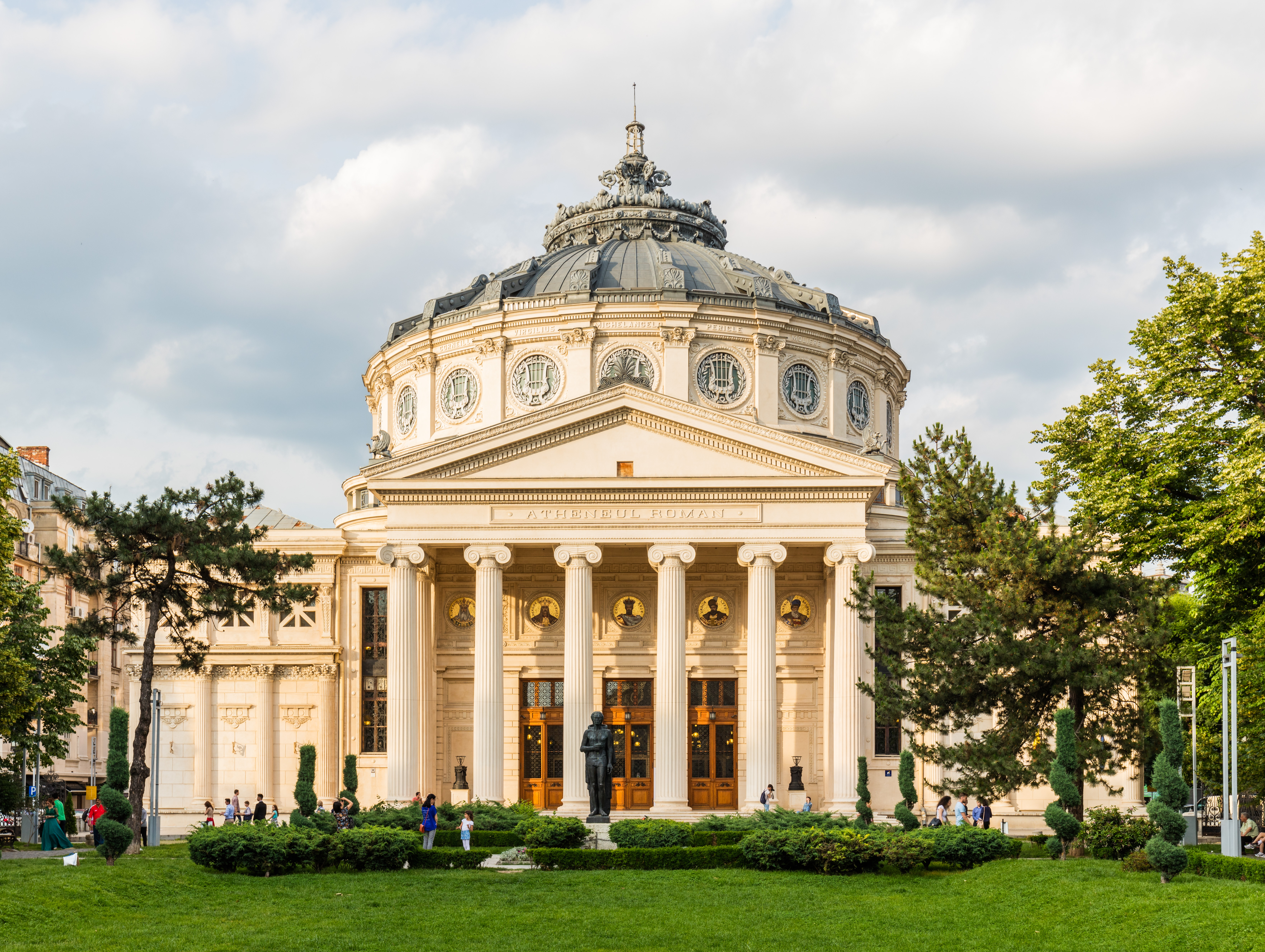
The Romanian Athenaeum has been the home of the George Enescu Philharmonic Orchestra since 1889.

The George Enescu Philharmonic Orchestra (Romanian: Filarmonica "George Enescu") is a Romanian orchestra based in Bucharest. Founded in 1868 as the Romanian Philharmonic Society, it is one of Romania's oldest permanent symphonic institutions and is based at the Romanian Athenaeum.

After the death of George Enescu in 1955, the Philharmonic was renamed in his honour. The institution also includes the George Enescu Philharmonic Choir, founded in 1950 by Constantin Silvestri.

== History ==
=== Founding and early years ===
The Romanian Philharmonic Society was founded in 1868 under the supervision of Eduard Wachmann, with the purpose of creating a permanent symphony orchestra in Bucharest. Its first concert took place on 15 December of the same year.

After the Romanian Athenaeum was built in 1888, the orchestra inaugurated the building with a concert on 5 March 1889, and the Athenaeum became its permanent home.

Wachmann conducted the first permanent orchestra until 1907 and was followed by Dimitrie Dinicu. In 1920, George Georgescu, a student of Arthur Nikisch and George Enescu, became one of the orchestra's defining artistic leaders.

=== Interwar period ===
Under Georgescu, the orchestra modernised its repertoire, undertook international tours and became more strongly integrated into European musical life. The Philharmonic's interwar seasons brought to Bucharest major musicians including Jacques Thibaud, Pablo Casals, Igor Stravinsky, Enrico Mainardi, Alfred Cortot, Maurice Ravel, Richard Strauss, Yehudi Menuhin and Herbert von Karajan.

=== Postwar development ===
After World War II, the institution expanded its activity by creating the Academic Choir, a group of permanent soloists and several chamber ensembles. The Philharmonic Choir was founded on 1 December 1950 by Constantin Silvestri. After Enescu's death in 1955, the Philharmonic took his name. By tradition, the orchestra is also associated with the opening of the George Enescu Festival.

The postwar period was shaped by Romanian conductors and artistic leaders including Constantin Silvestri, Mircea Basarab, Dumitru Capoianu, Ion Voicu, Mihai Brediceanu, Horia Andreescu, Christian Badea and Cristian Mandeal.

=== After 1990 ===
After 1990, the institution was led by pianist Dan Grigore, followed by conductor Cristian Mandeal, who was general director from 1991 to 2009. Mandeal's period is associated with more than 30 tours in Europe and Asia and with a discography including Enescu and Brahms cycles. Andrei Dimitriu later served as general director, and in 2022 cellist Marin Cazacu became manager of the Philharmonic.

In January 2026, the orchestra announced the appointment of Robert Treviño as its next principal conductor, effective with the 2026–2027 season, with an initial contract of four years.

== Principal conductors and artistic leadership ==
The orchestra's artistic leadership has included Eduard Wachmann, Dimitrie Dinicu, George Georgescu, Constantin Silvestri, Mircea Basarab, Dumitru Capoianu, Ion Voicu, Mihai Brediceanu, Cristian Mandeal, Horia Andreescu, Christian Badea, Gabriel Bebeșelea, Leo Hussain and Robert Treviño.

Wachmann led the first permanent orchestra until 1907, while Georgescu directed the Philharmonic in the periods 1920–1944 and 1954–1964. Cristian Mandeal was general director from 1991 to 2009, a period associated with international tours and recordings, including complete cycles of works by George Enescu and Johannes Brahms.

Sergiu Celibidache was named lifetime honorary director of the Philharmonic after his 1990 visit to Romania. Gabriel Bebeșelea is identified in external profiles as Principal Conductor of the George Enescu Philharmonic Orchestra, while Leo Hussain is identified by the English National Opera as Principal Guest Conductor of the Enescu Philharmonic Orchestra.

== Guest conductors and soloists ==
Across its history, the orchestra has worked with major conductors, composers and soloists from Romania and abroad. In the interwar period, its Bucharest seasons brought figures such as Jacques Thibaud, Pablo Casals, Igor Stravinsky, Enrico Mainardi, Alfred Cortot, Maurice Ravel, Richard Strauss, Yehudi Menuhin and Herbert von Karajan to the Romanian Athenaeum.

After 1990, the orchestra's international collaborations included conductors such as Sergiu Comissiona, Lawrence Foster, Heinrich Schiff, Seiji Ozawa, Cristian Măcelaru, Thomas Sanderling, Leonard Slatkin, Jean-Claude Casadesus, Jin Wang, Camil Marinescu, Charles Dutoit, Kent Nagano, Daniele Rustioni, Dennis Russell Davies, Nayden Todorov, Vasily Petrenko and Mikhail Pletnev, as well as soloists including Elisabeth Leonskaja, Nelson Goerner, Khatia Buniatishvili, Mischa Maisky, Renaud Capuçon, Gidon Kremer, Leonidas Kavakos, Nikolai Lugansky, Kirill Gerstein, Gautier Capuçon, Matthias Goerne, Ton Koopman, Frank Peter Zimmermann, Daniel Hope, Julian Rachlin, Alexandre Tharaud, Tine Thing Helseth, Katia and Marielle Labèque, Nobuyuki Tsujii and Federico Colli.

== Recordings and tours ==
The Philharmonic has made LP and CD recordings and has toured in Europe, Asia and the Far East. Under Cristian Mandeal, the orchestra recorded cycles including the symphonic works of George Enescu and the symphonies of Johannes Brahms.

Commercial recordings with Mandeal and the George Enescu Philharmonic Orchestra include Brahms's four symphonies and orchestral works released by Arte Nova in the 1990s.

The appointment of Robert Treviño as principal conductor from the 2026–2027 season was announced as part of a new artistic phase for the orchestra, including plans for international touring and recordings with Ondine Records.

== See also ==
- Romanian Athenaeum
- George Enescu Festival
- George Enescu
