= Justina Gringytė =

Lithuanian operatic mezzo-soprano

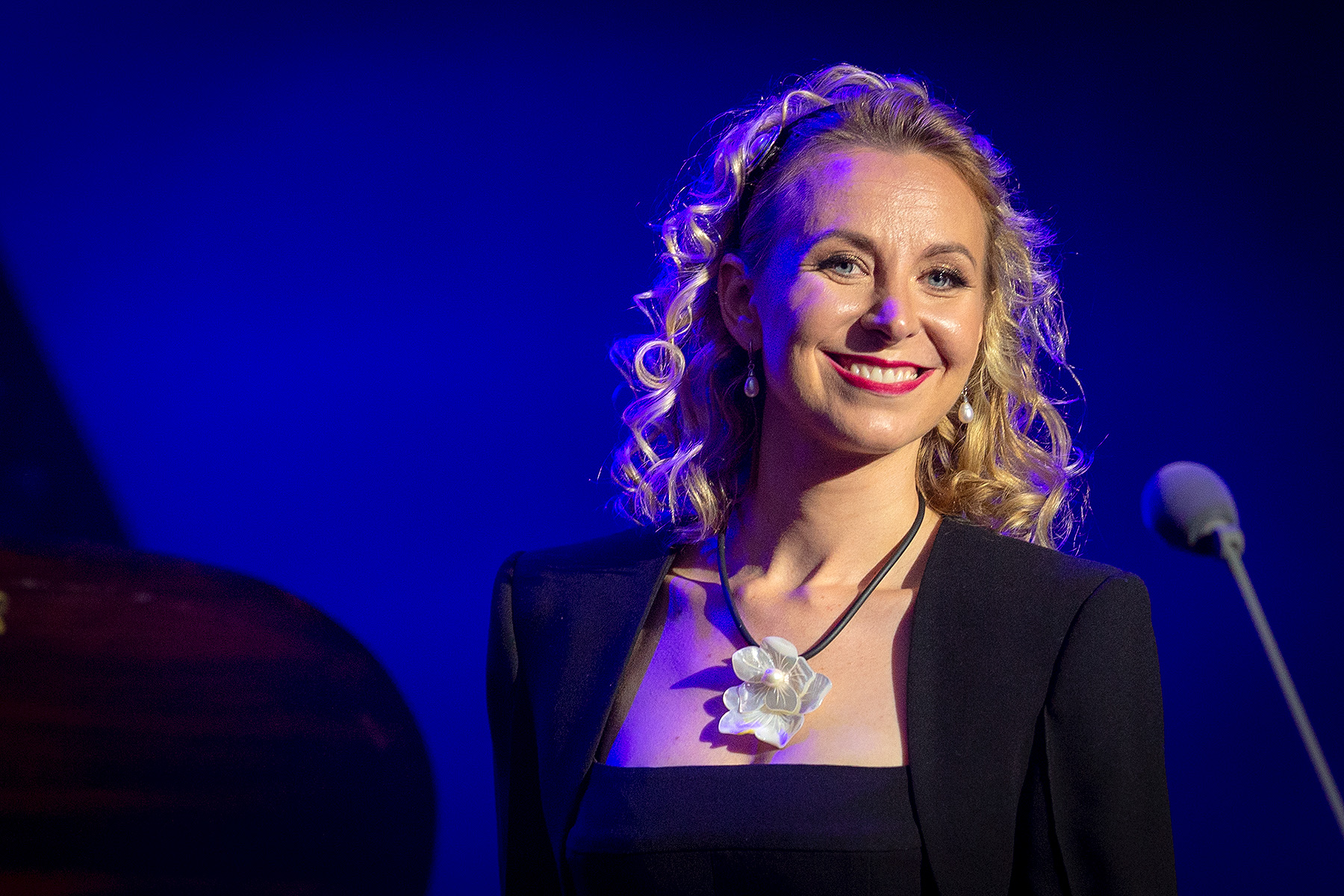
- Born: 1986 (age 39–40); Alytus, Lithuania
- Education: Academy of Music, Lithuania; Royal Welsh College of Music & Drama; National Opera Studio
- Occupation: Opera Singer
- Awards: 2015 International Opera Awards Young Singer of the Year
- Website: www.justinagringyte.com

Justina Gringytė (born 1986) is a Lithuanian operatic mezzo-soprano. A former Samling and Jette Parker Young Artist, Gringytė trained as a pianist before commencing her studies at the Lithuanian Academy of Music and Theatre before joining the Royal Welsh College of Music and London's National Opera Studio.

During her time as a member of the Jette Parker Young Artists programme, the characters Gringytė played included Maddalena (Rigoletto), Flora Bervoix (La traviata), Wood Nymph (Rusalka), Maddalena (Il viaggio a Reims), Innocent (The Minotaur), Albina (La donna del lago) and Suzy (La rondine). Gringytė made her house debut in the 2013/14 season as Maddalena in Giuseppe Verdi's Rigoletto before appearing with the Welsh National Opera as Fenena in Nabucco. In 2014/15, Gringytė reprised the role of Maddalena at the Royal Opera House and The Bolshoi, and played Hänsel for the first time in Hänsel und Gretel for the Vilnius City Opera. The 2014/15 season also saw Gringytė debut the title character in Carmen, leading to critical acclaim. Her performance of Carmen with English National Opera, in a production by Calixto Bieito, was filmed and screened in cinemas across the UK. In 2022, she played Amneris in a production another Verdi opera, Aida, at the Israeli Opera and performed as Amneris again in 2023 with Lithuanian National Opera and Ballet Theatre.

== Personal life ==
In 2023, Gringytė married the Mexican-American conductor Robert Treviño.

== Awards and nominations ==
Her debut recording, The Complete Rachmaninov Songs with pianist Iain Burnside, was nominated for a 2014 Gramophone Award.

In 2015, Gringytė won in the category of Young Singer at the International Opera Awards.

== Discography ==
=== Delphian Records ===
- Rachmaninov: Songs (2014)
- Medtner: Songs (2018)

=== Deutsche Grammophon ===
- Raminta Šerkšnytė: Going For The Impossible - A Portrait (2020)
