= Romanian Athenaeum =

Concert hall in Bucharest, Romania

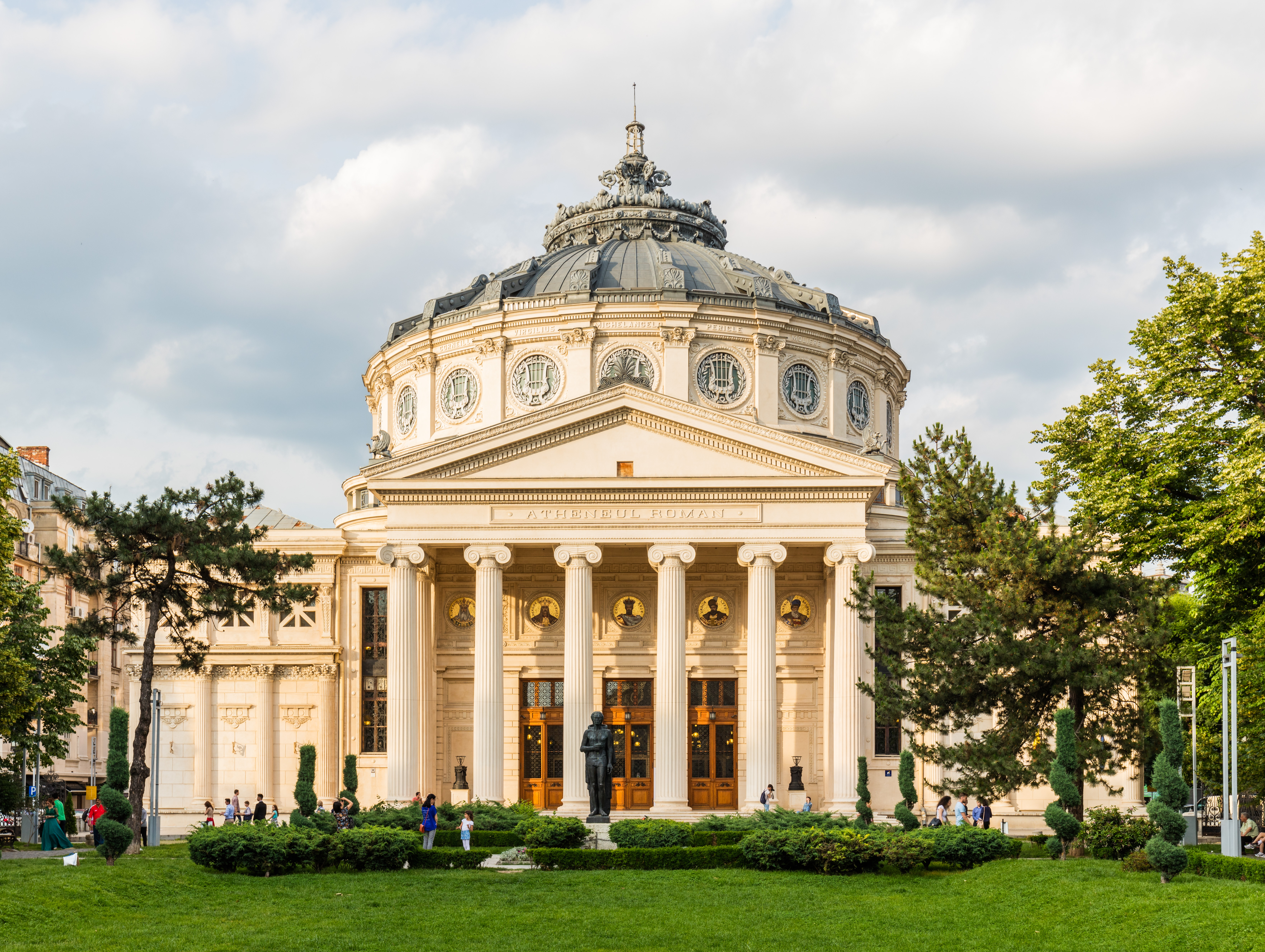
- Interactive map of the Romanian Athenaeum area

General information
- Architectural style: Neoclassical
- Location: str. Franklin nr. 1-3, sector 1, Bucharest, Romania
- Coordinates: 44.4413°N 26.0973°E
- Opened: 1888
- Owner: Romanian Philharmonic Society

Design and construction
- Architect: Albert Galleron

Other information
- Seating capacity: 794 seats

Website
- fge.org.ro

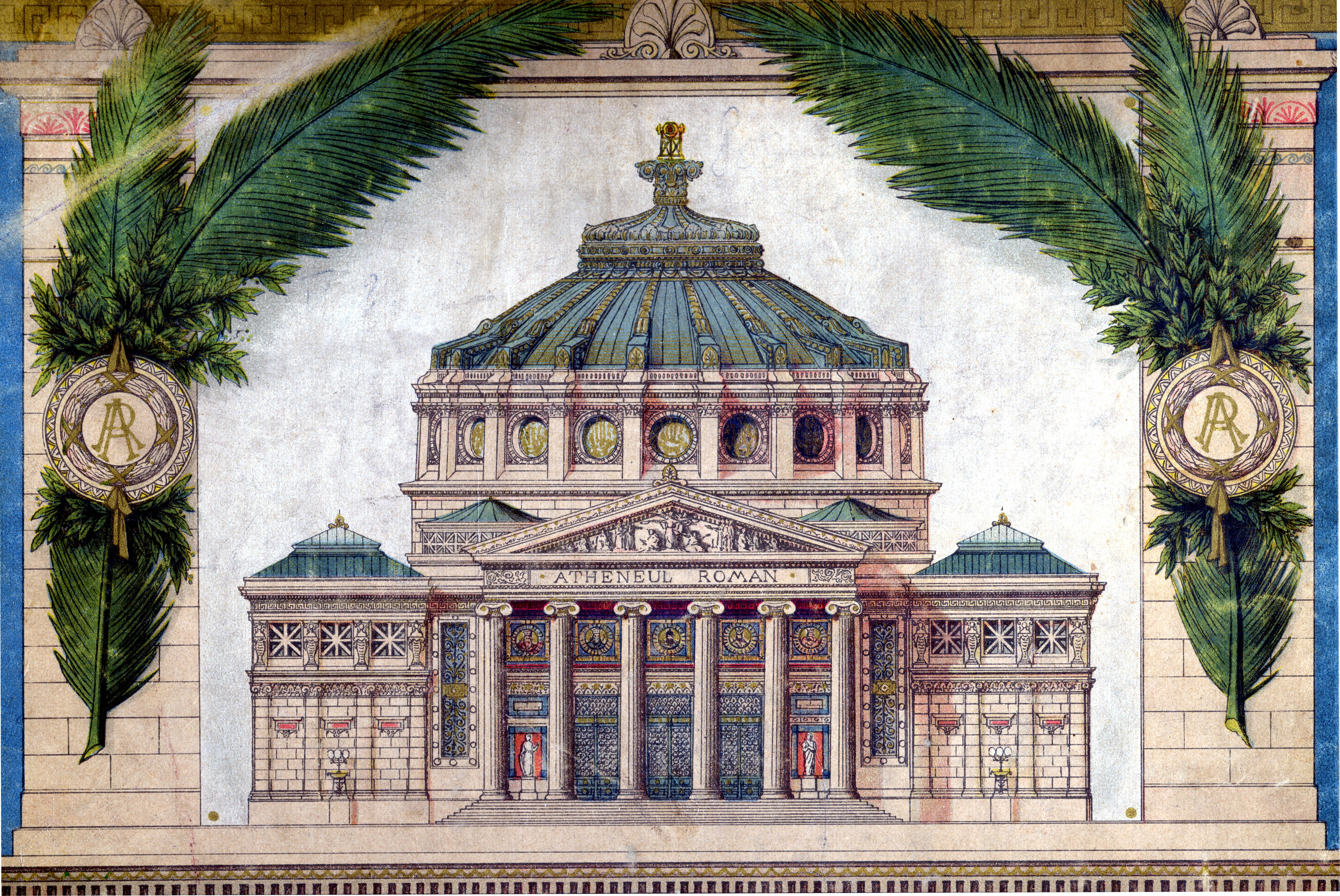
Albert Galleron's drawing of the Athenaeum

The Romanian Athenaeum (Romanian: Ateneul Român) is a concert hall in the center of Bucharest, Romania, and a landmark of the Romanian capital city. Opened in 1888, the ornate, domed, circular building is the city's most prestigious concert hall and home of the "George Enescu" Philharmonic and of the George Enescu Festival.

== History ==
In 1865, cultural and scientific personalities such as Constantin Esarcu, V. A. Urechia, and Nicolae Kretzulescu founded the Romanian Athenaeum Cultural Society. To serve its purposes, the Romanian Athenaeum, a building dedicated to art and science, would be erected in Bucharest.

The building was designed by the French architect Albert Galleron, built on a property that had belonged to the Văcărescu family and inaugurated in 1888, although work continued until 1897. A portion of the construction funds was raised by public subscription in a 28-year-long effort, of which the slogan is still remembered today: "Donate one leu for the Ateneu!" (Romanian "Dați un leu pentru Ateneu!").

On December 29, 1919, the Athenaeum was the site of the conference of leading Romanians who voted to ratify the unification of Bessarabia, Transylvania, and Bukovina with the Romanian Old Kingdom to constitute Greater Romania.

Extensive reconstruction and restoration work has been conducted in 1992 by a Romanian construction company and restoration painter Silviu Petrescu, saving the building from collapse. The nine million Euro required were contributed in equal shares by the government and the Council of Europe Development Bank.

== Building and facilities ==
The overall style is neoclassical, with some more romantic touches. In front of the building there is a small park and a statue of Romanian poet Mihai Eminescu.

Inside, the ground floor hosts an ornate conference hall as large as the auditorium above; in the auditorium there are 600 seats in the stalls, the rest of the seats being placed in 52 loges.

A 75-by-3-metre (246.1 by 9.8 ft) fresco by Costin Petrescu decorates the inside of the circular wall of the concert hall. Painted using the al fresco technique, the piece depicts the most important moments of Romanian history, starting with the conquest of Dacia by Roman emperor Trajan and ending with the realization of Greater Romania in 1918.

Recognized as a symbol of Romanian culture, the building has been inscribed in 2007 on the list of the Label of European Heritage sites.

== Gallery ==
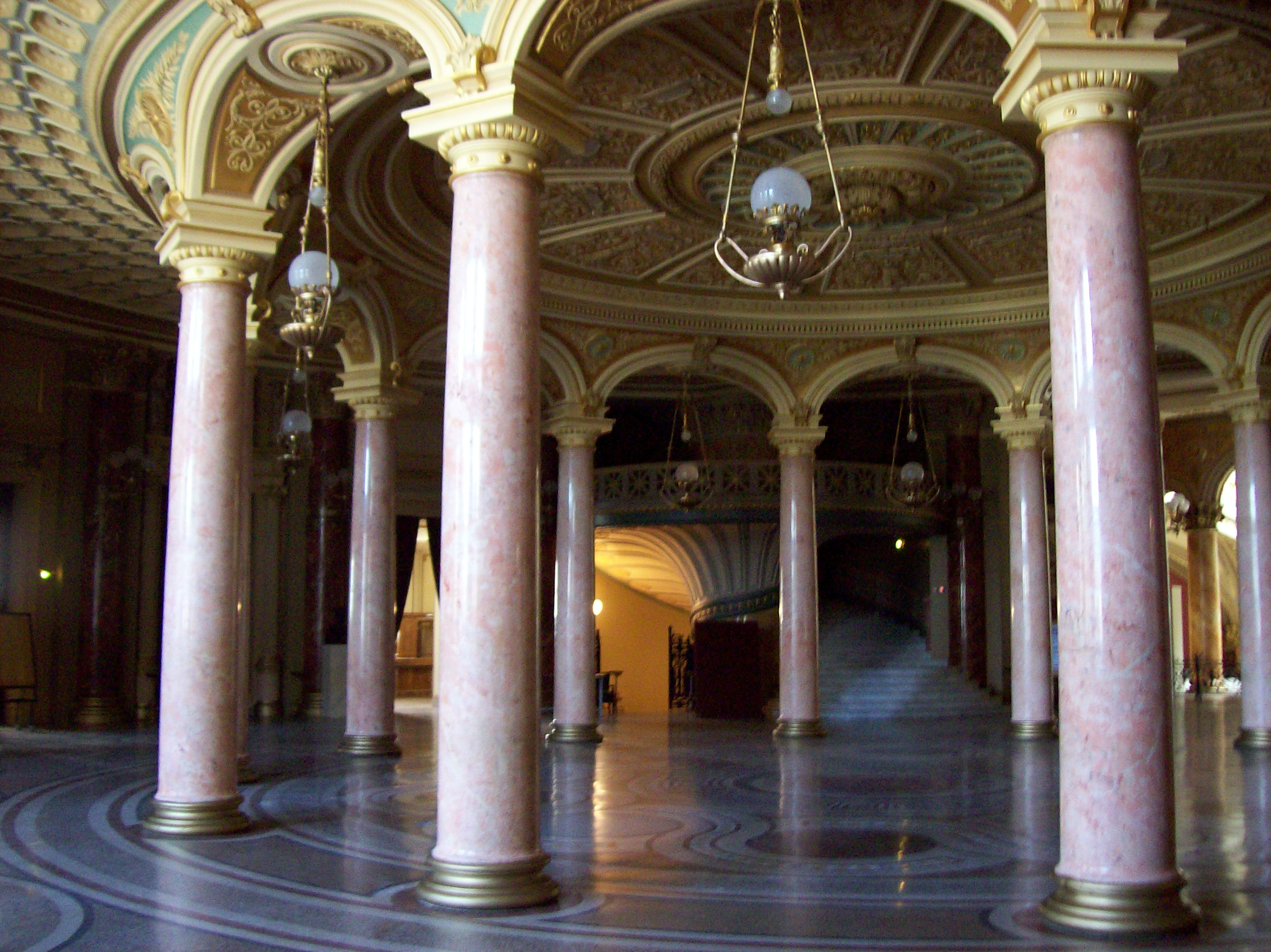

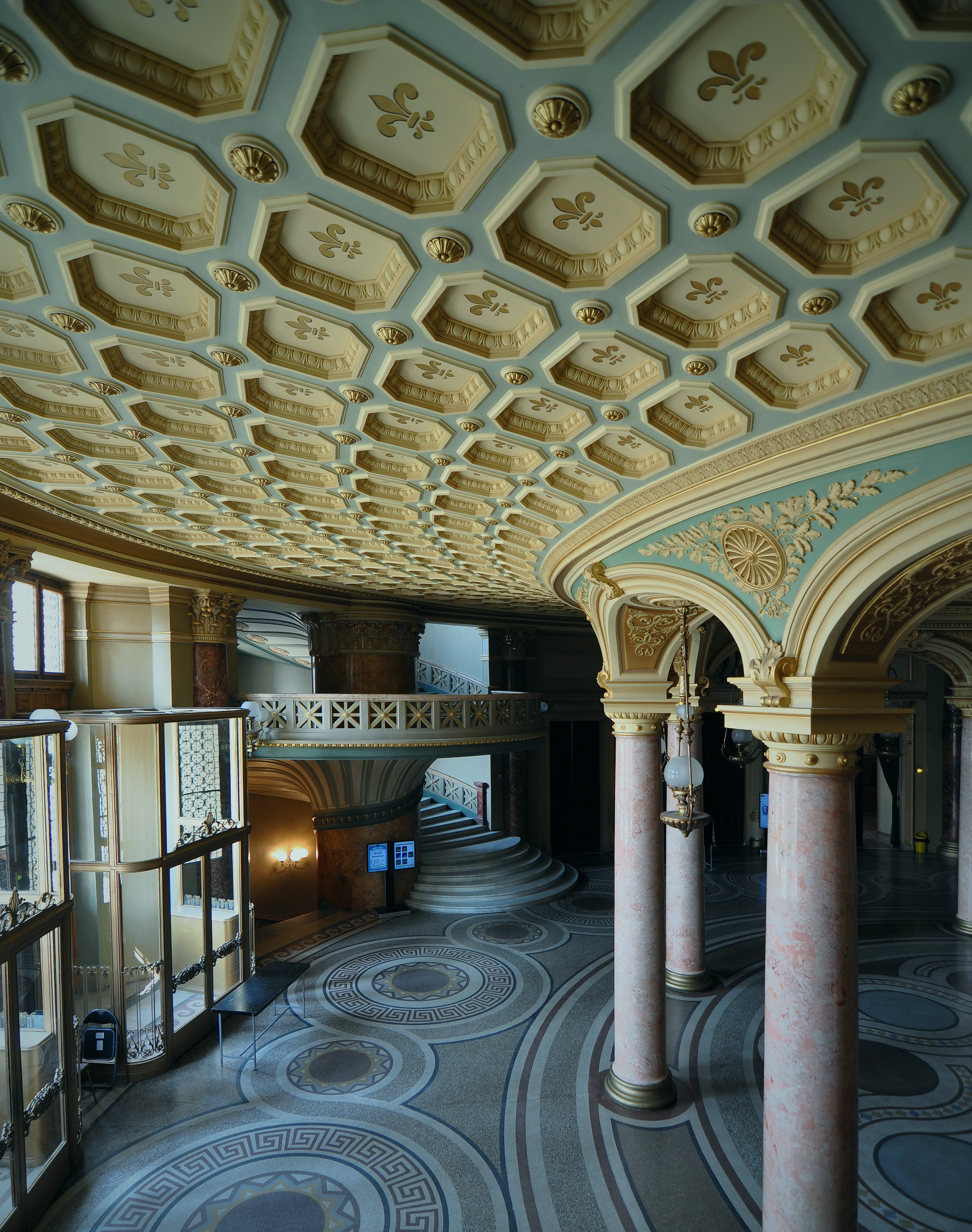

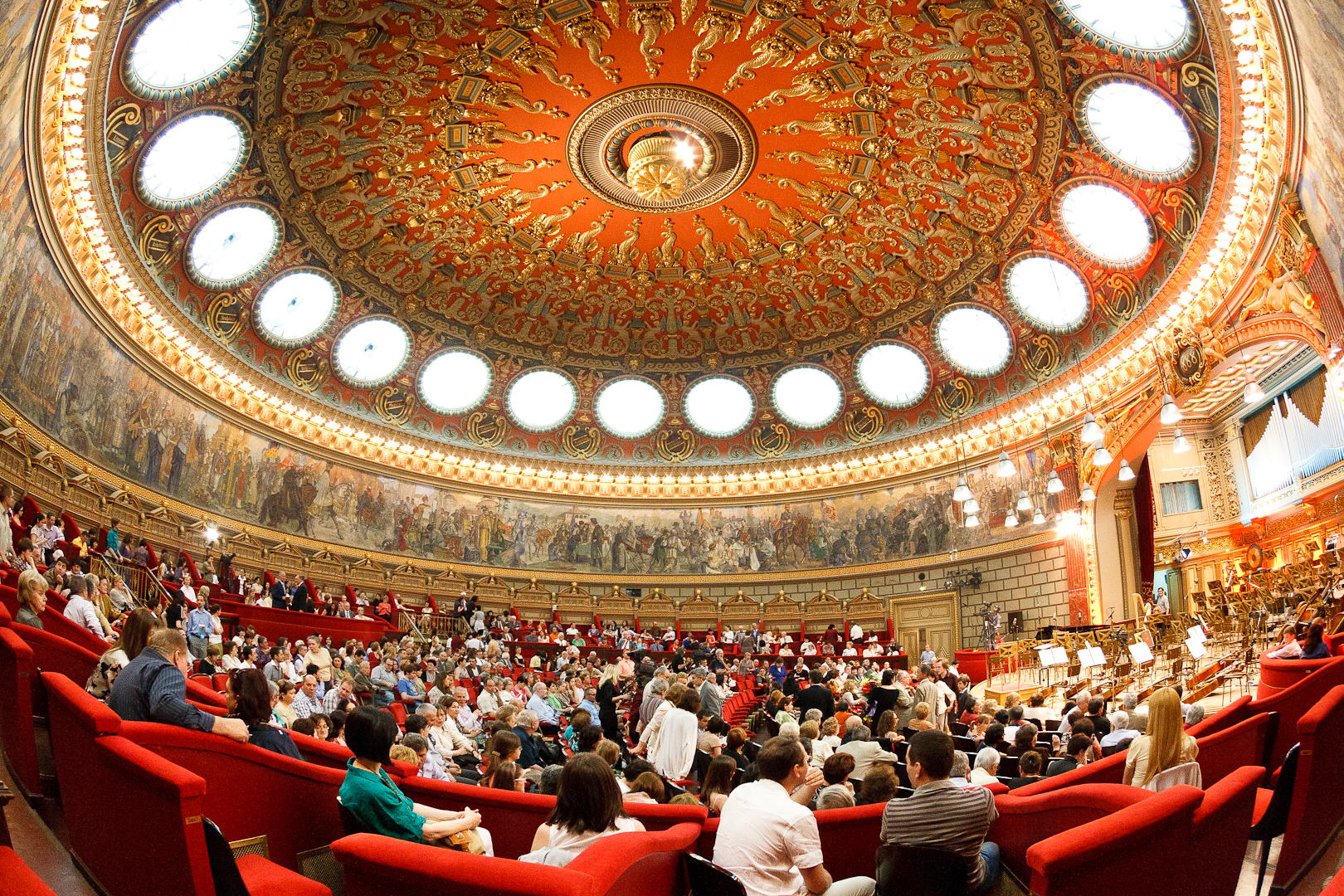

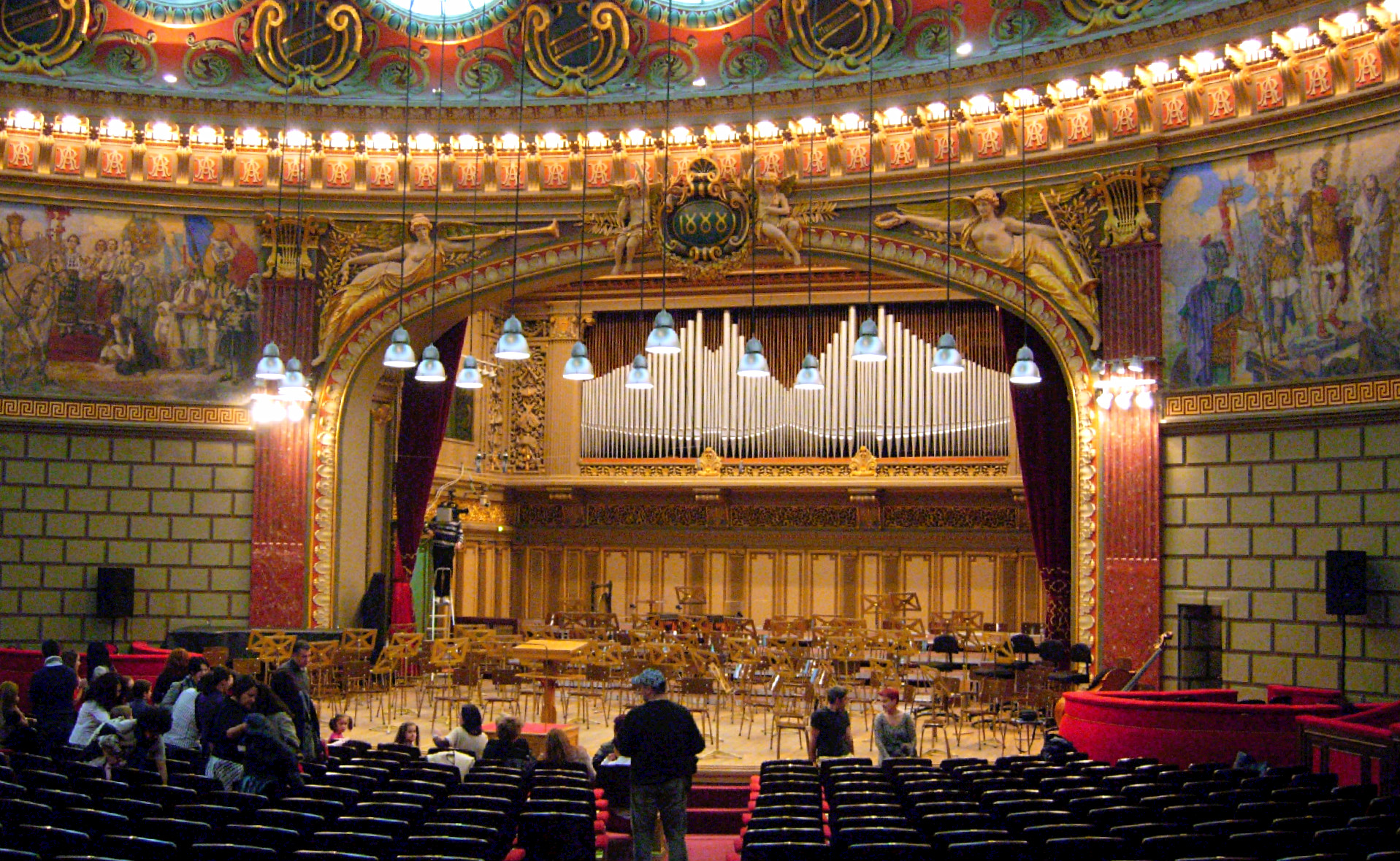

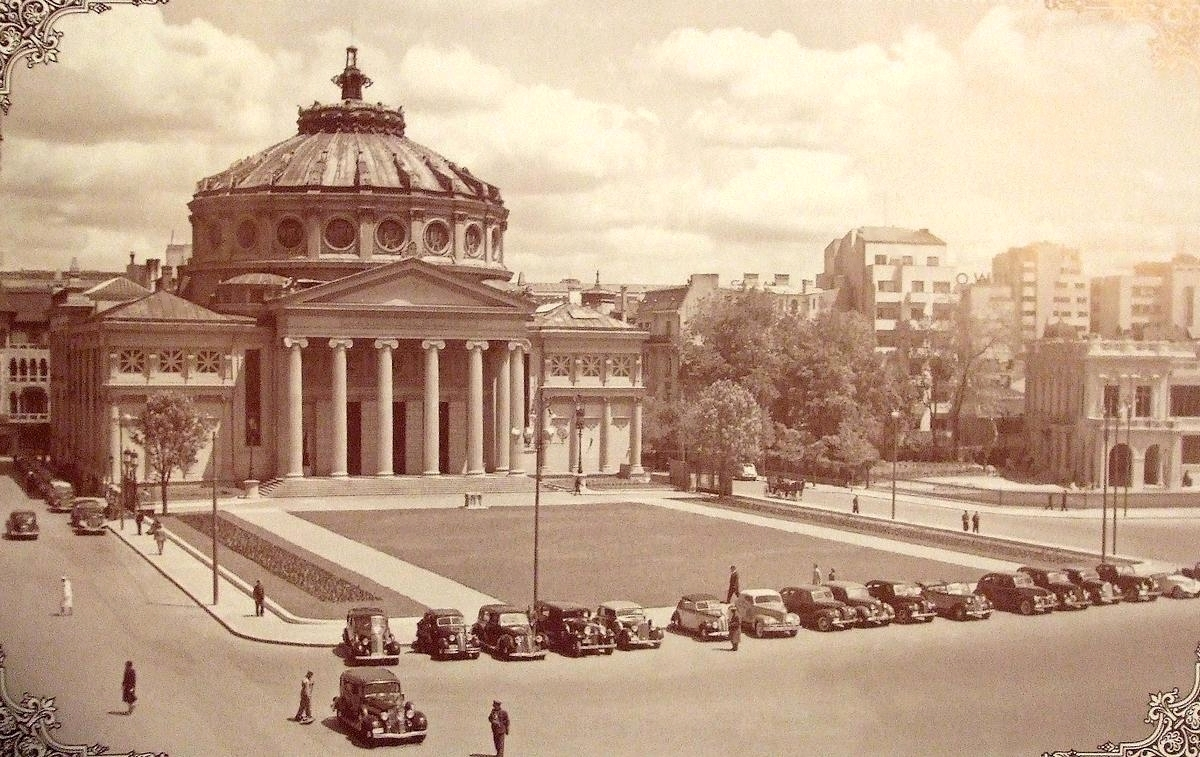

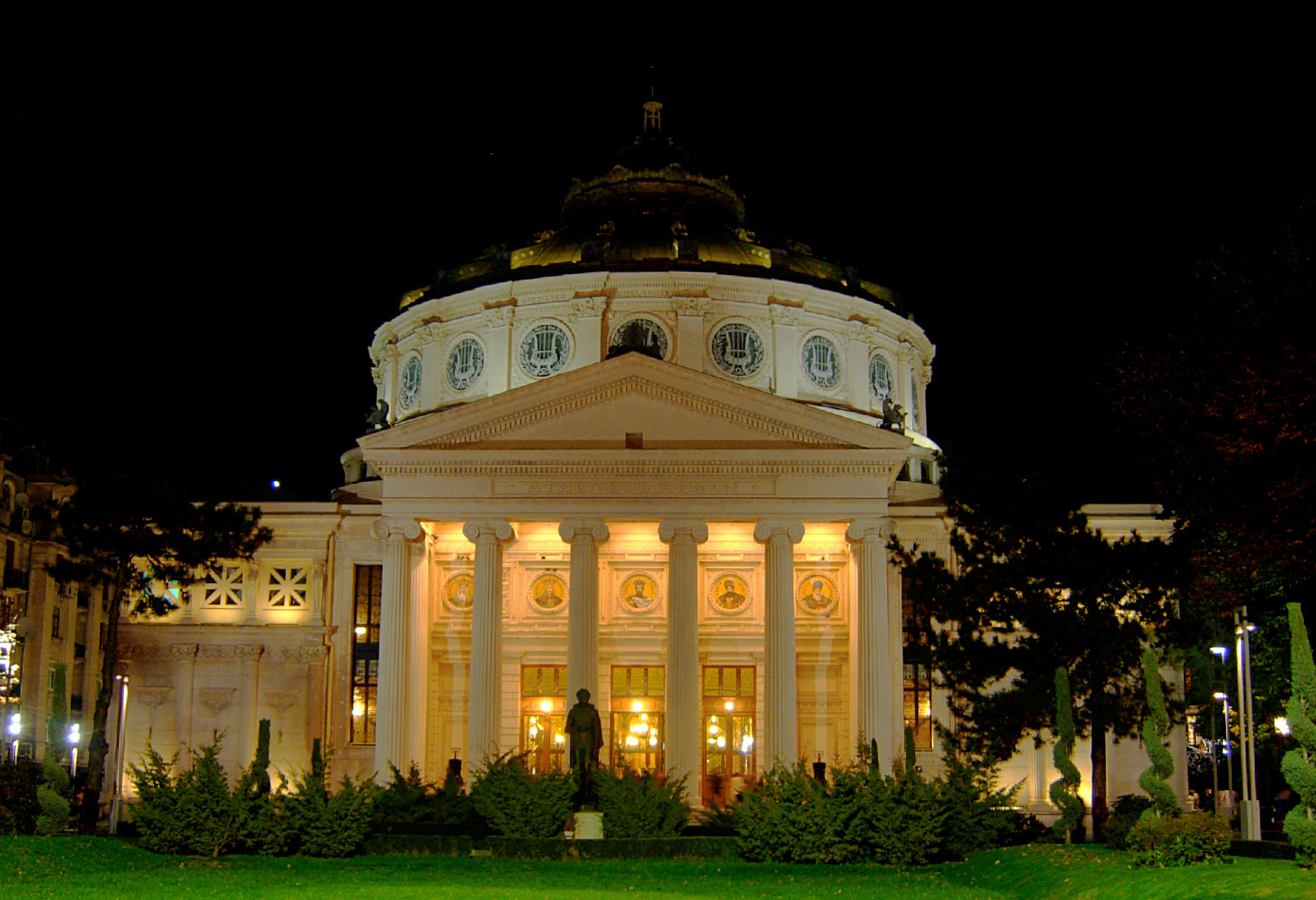

== See also ==
- Tourism in Romania
- Seven Wonders of Romania
- List of concert halls
- George Enescu Festival
- George Enescu Philharmonic Orchestra
