= Yolanda Marculescu =

- Marculescu c. 1940s
- Born: Iolanda Mărculescu; 2 April 1923; Bucharest, Romania
- Died: 19 December 1992 (aged 69); Milwaukee, Wisconsin, United States
- Other name: Yolanda Marculescu-Stern
- Occupations: Opera singer, educator
- Years active: 1943–1992

Yolanda Marculescu (Romanian: Iolanda Mărculescu-Stern; 2 April 1923 – 19 December 1992) was a Romanian American coloratura soprano and diva of the Romanian National Opera in Bucharest from 1948 to 1968. Fleeing the communist bloc, Marculescu became a naturalized American citizen in 1974. In the United States she founded the International Festival of the Art Song at the University of Wisconsin–Milwaukee in 1981. The festival was held biennially until her death in 1992.

== Biography ==
Iolanda Mărculescu was born on 2 April 1923 in Bucharest, Romania to a family of Wallachian boyars. She studied at the Conservatory of Bucharest under the direction of the tenor Constantin Stroescu. When she was twenty years old, she joined the Romanian State Radio Chorus Ensemble. At the end of World War II, she joined the Romanian National Opera in Bucharest and by 1948 was the leading soprano.

Mărculescu married Sandu Stern, who was the first violinist of the Bucharest Symphony Orchestra and of Jewish heritage. She was the prima donna of the Bucharest Opera for 20 years, appearing in more than 1500 performances. She starred extensively throughout Europe and the Far East in engagements in Austria, Czechoslovakia, East Germany, Finland, Hungary, Poland, the Soviet Union and Yugoslavia, as well as China and Vietnam. Some of her most noted roles were as the title role in Lakmé by Léo Delibes; Despina in Così fan tutte, Susanna in The Marriage of Figaro and Zerlina in Don Giovanni by Mozart; and Lisetta in Amorul doctor by Pascal Bentoiu. Besides Susanna, her personal favorite roles included Rosina in Rossini's The Barber of Seville; Gilda in Rigoletto and Nannetta in Falstaff, both by Verdi. Her specialty was singing lieder. In addition to performance, she taught voice at the Bucharest Music Academy from 1962 to 1968.

Shortly after Nicolae Ceaușescu assumed control of the State Council in December 1967, becoming de jure head of state of Romania, Mărculescu and Stern began making plans to leave. It took from March to August 1968 to obtain the tourists visas from Romania, but they were unable to secure permission for Mărculescu's mother. The couple fled with her husband's mother to Austria and their defection branded them as enemies of the state. Convicted of treason, they were sentenced to twenty years in prison should they return, forcing friends and relatives to distance themselves or face persecution. Her records and television recordings were destroyed, though a few managed to survive. When they left, she had just recorded an album containing arias of Bizet, Gounod, Mozart and Rossini. She was surprised that it was pressed, but received copies of it from friends, though it was banned on the radio. With the assistance of the Viennese branch of the Hebrew Immigrant Aid Society, and the American Jewish Joint Distribution Committee they relocated to the United States, in October 1968, first settling in Chicago, where Marculescu taught at Roosevelt University.

In 1969, Sandu was hired by the Milwaukee Symphony Orchestra and the couple moved to Wisconsin. Marculescu found a teaching position that same year at the University of Wisconsin–Milwaukee. She began as an associate professor and taught French and German repertory. She also directed the Opera Theater of the School of Fine Arts. In 1974, the couple became naturalized American citizens and in 1975, she recorded an album for Orion Records featuring songs by the Romanian composer George Enescu and French composer Albert Roussel. In 1981, Marculescu founded the International Festival of the Art Song, which was held biennially until her death in Milwaukee. The festival was designed to teach art song to students and the public by bringing European artists to perform and conduct master classes.

In 1991, after the fall of communism, Marculescu was invited to return to Romania as a juror for the George Enescu Festival. She returned to the United States and that same year received the Distinguished Teaching Award from the University of Wisconsin—Milwaukee. In 1992, she was honored by the Milwaukee Civic Music Association Award and then retired from her professorship in June, 1992. Marculescu-Stern died on 19 December 1992 in Milwaukee, Wisconsin after a year long battle with cancer. Posthumously, a scholarship bearing her name was instituted at the National University of Music Bucharest by a former student, Georgeta Stoleriu. In 2013, a book about her life, written by Ileana Ursu was released by Editura Muzicală.

iolanda-marculescu-cristalul-de-baccara-al-operei-romanesti/== References ==

== Sources ==
- Cornfield, Giveon (2013). Note-Perfect: Thirty Years in Classical Music Recordings. Bloomington, Indiana: Xlibris Corporation. ISBN 978-1-4797-7798-3.
