= Robert Treviño =

American conductor (born 1984)

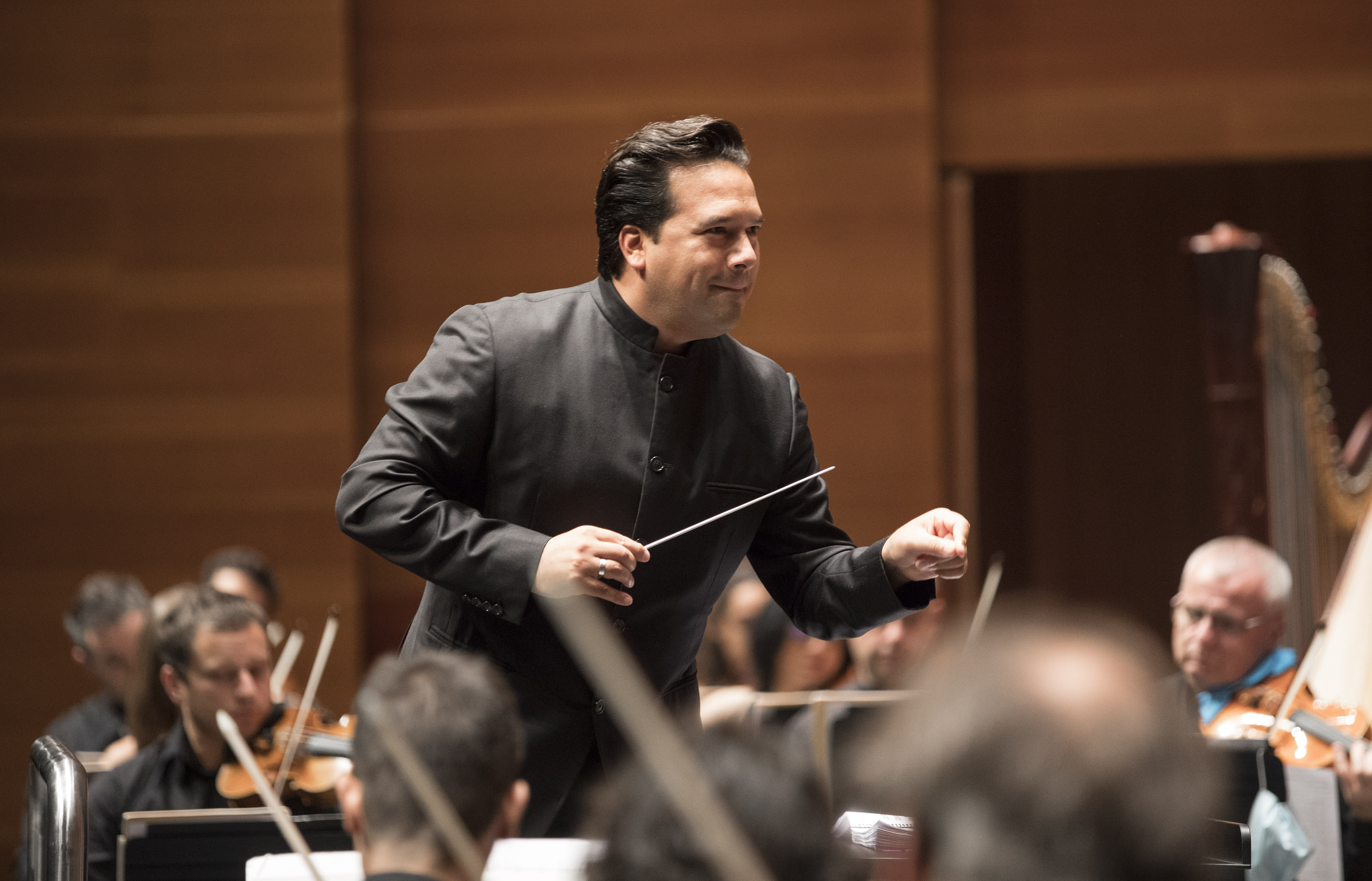
- Robert Treviño, 2020
- Born: 1984 (age 41–42)
- Occupation: conductor
- Years active: 2003–present
- Website: robert-trevino.com

Robert Treviño (born 1984) is an American conductor. He is the incoming principal conductor of the George Enescu Philharmonic Orchestra, and principal guest conductor of the Orchestra Sinfonica Nazionale della RAI.

== Biography ==
Treviño, who is Mexican American, grew up in the Fort Worth, Texas region, specifically in North Richland Hills, Texas. As a youth, Treviño studied the bassoon. Treviño attended the University of Texas at Arlington, where he studied conducting and formed his own orchestra. He then subsequently attended Roosevelt University, where his teachers included David McGill.

Treviño's conducting mentors have included Leif Segerstam, Kurt Masur, Michael Tilson Thomas, and David Zinman. He made his professional debut as a conductor in 2003 at the age of 20 in Wuppertal, Germany. In 2010, Treviño won the James Conlon Prize for Excellence in Conducting at the Aspen Music Festival and School.

From 2009 to 2011, Treviño was associate conductor for the New York City Opera. He was then associate conductor at the Cincinnati Symphony Orchestra (CSO) from 2011 to 2015.

Treviño became music director of the Basque National Orchestra as of the 2017–2018 season. In June 2018, Treviño's contract with the orchestra was extended through the 2021–2022 season. In June 2022, the Basque National Orchestra announced the extension of his music directorship for an indefinite tenure. In January 2025, the board of the Basque National Orchestra concluded Treviño's contract as music director with immediate effect, as part of a change of the entire leadership of the orchestra. The New Yorker noted his raising of the orchestra's international profile,

Treviño became chief conductor of the Malmö Symphony Orchestra as of the 2019–2020 season. With the Malmö Symphony Orchestra, Treviño has recorded commercially for Ondine, including a Beethoven symphony cycle. In May 2021, the Malmö Symphony Orchestra announced that Treviño is to stand down as its chief conductor at the close of the 2020-2021 season, and then to take the title of artistic adviser for 2 years. Separately in May 2021, the RAI National Symphony Orchestra announced the appointment of Treviño as its next principal guest conductor, with an initial contract of 3 years, following his January 2019 guest-conducting debut with the orchestra and a return engagement in November 2020.

Further recordings for Ondine have included "Ravel", "Ravel 2", "Americascapes", an album of music by Einojuhani Rautavaara, Respighi's "Roman Trilogy" and "Americascapes 2: American Opus". In addition he recorded a complete cycle of symphonies by Max Bruch for CPO Records. These recordings have between them amassed more than 16 accolades from reviews publications around the world, including "Recording of the Year" from Presto Music and a Gramophone Classical Music Awards nomination.

In November 2025, Treviño first guest-conducted the George Enescu Philharmonic Orchestra. Based on this appearance, in January 2026, the orchestra announced the appointment of Treviño as its next principal conductor, effective with the 2026–2027 season, with an initial contract of four years.

== Personal life ==
In 2023, Treviño married the Lithuanian mezzo-soprano Justina Gringytė.

== Awards and fellowships ==
- 2010: James Conlon Prize for Excellence in Conducting at the Aspen Music Festival and School
- 2010: Solti Foundation Career Assistance Award
- 2011: "Bruno Walter National Conductor Preview" participant
- 2011: Tanglewood Music Center Conducting Fellow
- 2011: Laureate of the Evgeny Svetlanov International Conducting Competition
- 2012: Solti Foundation Career Development Award

Cultural offices
Preceded by Jun Märkl	Music Director, Basque National Orchestra; 2017–2025	Succeeded by (post vacant)
Preceded by Marc Soustrot	Chief Conductor, Malmö Symphony Orchestra; 2019–2021	Succeeded by Martyn Brabbins (designate)
