= Georgeta Stoleriu =

Romanian soprano (born 1946)

- Born: 19 January 1946 (age 80); Bucharest, Romania
- Occupations: operatic soprano and educator

Georgeta Stoleriu (born 19 January 1946) is a Romanian soprano who has had a career in opera and as a music educator. She has won numerous singing awards and medals, and her students have received multiple honors. She established the Yolanda Marculescu Scholarship in honor of her former teacher. She has also served as an international juror for singing competitions.

== Early life and education ==
Georgeta Stoleriu was born on 19 January 1946 in Bucharest and began studying music at an early age. She entered her first competition in 1953 and took first prize in the Youth Festival of Bucharest. She primarily studied piano at the Dinu Lipatti Music High School, but decided to change to voice when she was nineteen. Stoleriu attended the Conservatory of Bucharest, studying under Yolanda Marculescu and graduating in 1970. She then enrolled in 1974 at the Hochschule für Musik Franz Liszt, Weimar, studying with Lore Fischer. Completing her education in 1979, Stoleriu's career focused on interpreting symphonic and chamber music, with a preference for early music, though her repertoire includes a broad range encompassing contemporary composers.

== Career ==
Stoleriu has performed numerous concerts both at home and abroad. She has performed as a soloist on Radio Romania and with the National Radio Orchestra, with 3500 minutes of airtime. She was the soloist of "Musica Rediviva" for 20 years. Internationally, she has toured and performed in festivals in Austria, Bulgaria, the Czech Republic, France, Germany, Hungary, Italy, Moldova, Morocco, the Netherlands, Poland, Portugal, Slovakia, Spain, Sweden, Switzerland, the United States, and Yugoslavia. Stoleriu has performed for four decades and served as a juror in international competitions including such venues as 1986 International Singing Competition "Springtime in Prague", the 2003 International George Enescu Competition in Bucharest, and the 2007 International Vocal Competition in Malmö, Sweden.

She began teaching in the early 1980s at Dinu Lipatti High School, and later became a visiting associate teacher in voice at the National University of Music Bucharest. She has taught master courses in the Czech Republic, Romania, and the United States; taught at the Lithuanian Academy of Music and Theatre in Vilnius in 2004; and has run a studio for the study of early music for many years. Her students have accumulated over 50 international voice awards.

In 1995, as a tribute to her former teacher and mentor, Stoleriu established the Yolanda Marculescu Scholarship to recognize an outstanding student from the National University of Music Bucharest, but never her own students. The scholarship is worth approximately 500 euro. Over time, some of Stoleriu's own students have contributed to the scholarship tradition by awarding Stoleriu's students.
