= George Enescu Festival =

Classical music festival in Romania

- Genre: classical music
- Dates: September
- Locations: Bucharest, Iași, Sibiu
- Coordinates: 44.439144°N 26.094978°E
- Years active: 1958-present
- Website: www.festivalenescu.ro

The George Enescu Festival (also known as George Enescu International Festival and Competition), held in honor of the celebrated Romanian composer George Enescu, is the biggest classical music festival and classical international competition held in Romania and one of the biggest in Eastern Europe. The festival proposal was authored by Andrei Tudor in 1955. Enescu's close associate George Georgescu organized the first festival in 1958; highlights included a performance of Bach's Concerto for Two Violins with Yehudi Menuhin and David Oistrakh as soloists and a staging of Enescu's sole opera, Œdipe, with Constantin Silvestri conducting.

The official opening day of the Enescu Festival took place on 4 September 1958, merely three years after George Enescu's death. Among the music world's personalities that were present for this first edition of the festival were performers such as David Oistrakh, Halina Czerny-Stefanka, Nadia Boulanger, Monique Haas, Iacov Zak and Claudio Arrau, and conductors such as Sir John Barbirolli, Carlo Felice Cillario and Carlo Zecchi. On 22 September of the same year, the national premiere of George Enescu's lyrical tragedy "Oedipe" took place, starring a young David Ohanesian in the lead role. This role was going to mark out the rest of his career as a soloist (conductor: Constantin Silvestri, Directed by Jean Ranzescu, Scenery: Roland Laub).

Violinist, teacher, conductor and composer, worldwide known for his lush opera composition Oedipe, George Enescu presented his first work as a composer with the Collonne Orchestra in Paris, 1898; he also performed as a conductor at prestigious Carnegie Hall (NY). Enescu was also the teacher of one of the greatest violinists of the past century – Lord Yehudi Menuhin. Their bond was so strong that in 1995, Menuhin accepted the invitation to come to Romania to open the George Enescu International Festival. Menuhin also accepted to be the President of Honor of the Enescu Festival in 1998, though his schedule as a soloist was full up to 2003.

Today, an average of around 20 works by Romanian composer George Enescu are interpreted in the Enescu Festival each edition. The 2015 edition of the Enescu Festival (30 August – 20 September 2015 Bucharest) brings on stage interpretations from Enescu's works by record-breaking German violinist David Garrett, San Francisco Symphony Orchestra (Pulitzer Prize for Music), or Israel Philharmonic Orchestra under Zubin Mehta. Highlights of this edition of the Festival also include violinist Anne-Sophie Mutter, Berliner Philharmoniker, London Symphony Orchestra and Royal Liverpool Symphony Orchestra.

The concerts are held in three different venues in Bucharest, Iași and Sibiu. The 2007 presentations ended with a performance of Carl Orff's Carmina Burana before an audience of over 4,000 at the Sala Palatului.

The competition portion of the Festival lasts about a week, and it consists of three different categories: composition (118 participants in 2007), piano (44 in 2007), and violin (41 in 2007), each a record number of participants.

In the 2005 and 2007 presentations a daily open-air concert was added to the festival program. It is known as the Festival Piazza and features 3½ hours of classical music, in addition to movies about the life of George Enescu.

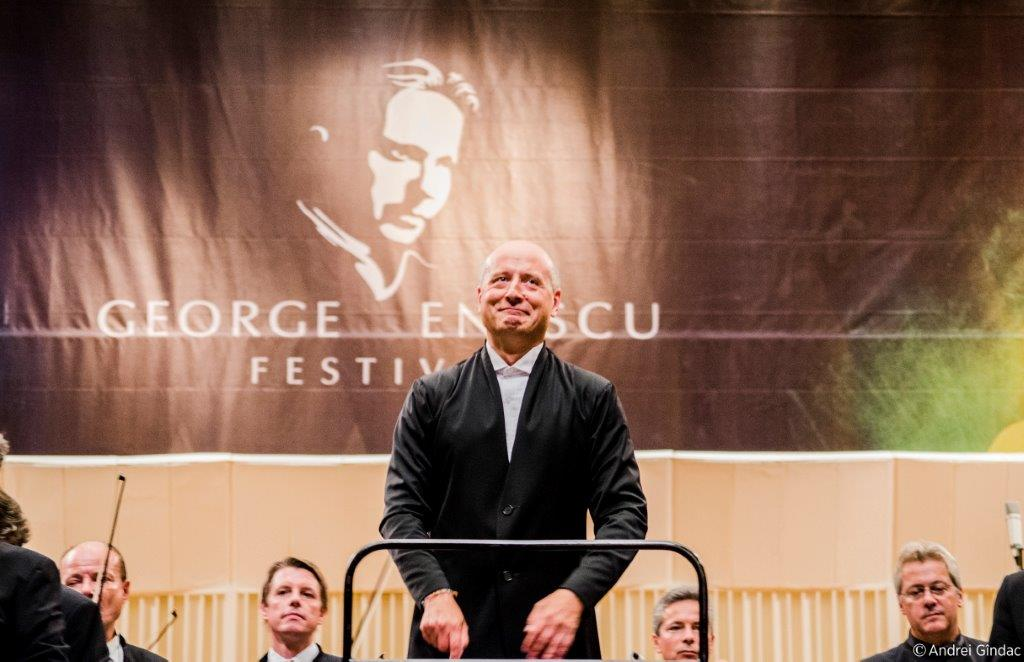
Dirijorul Paavo Järvi pe scena Sălii Palatului din București, în cadrul ediției 2013 a Festivalului Enescu

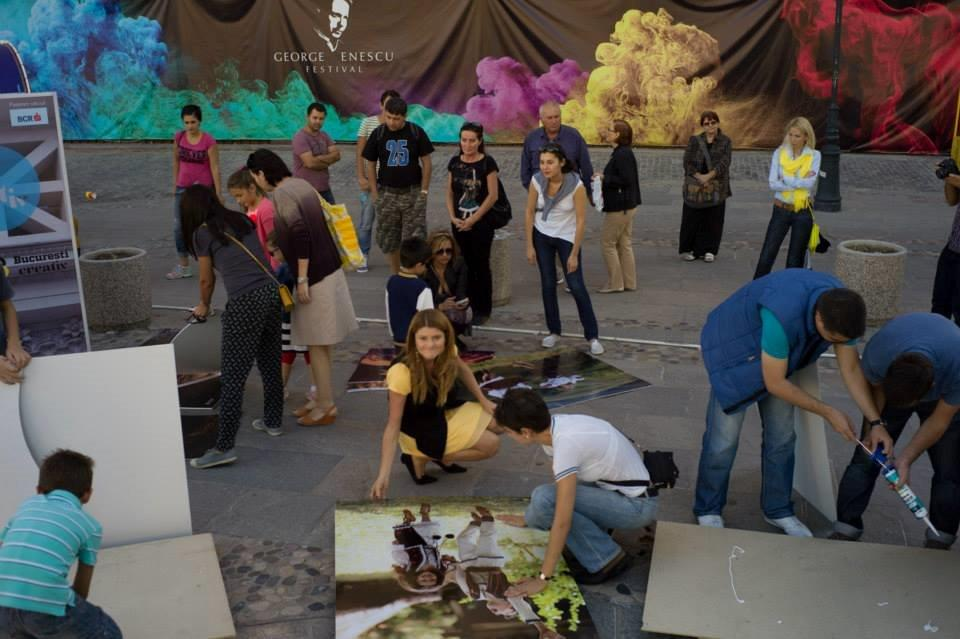
Țara lui Enescu, în cadrul Bucureștiului Creativ, la ediția 2013 a Festivalului Enescu

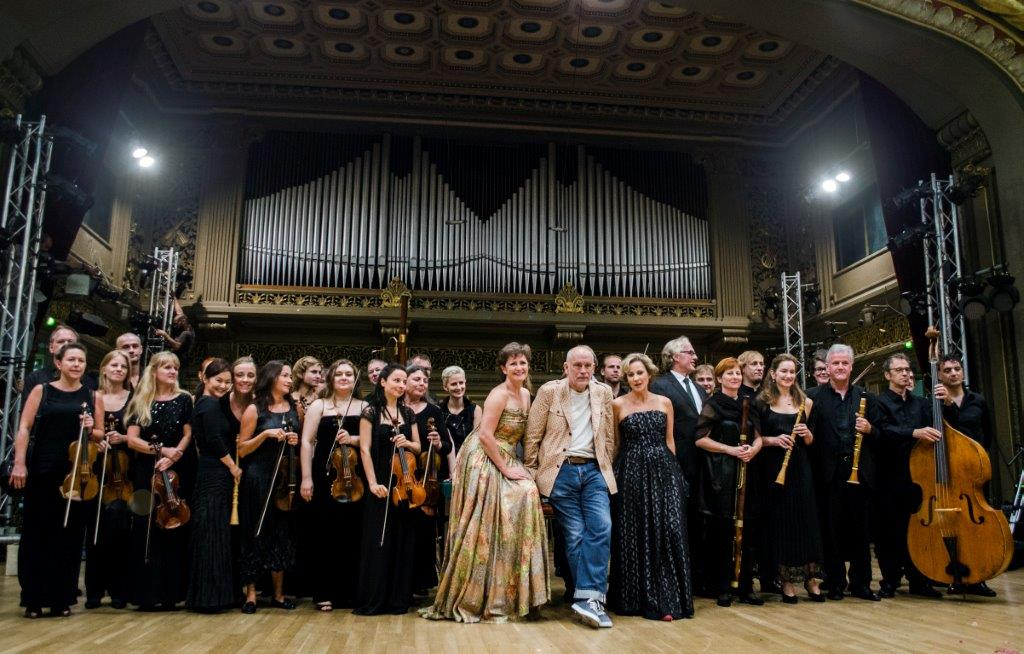
Actorul John Malkovich pe scena Ateneului Român la ediția 2013 a Festivalului Enescu

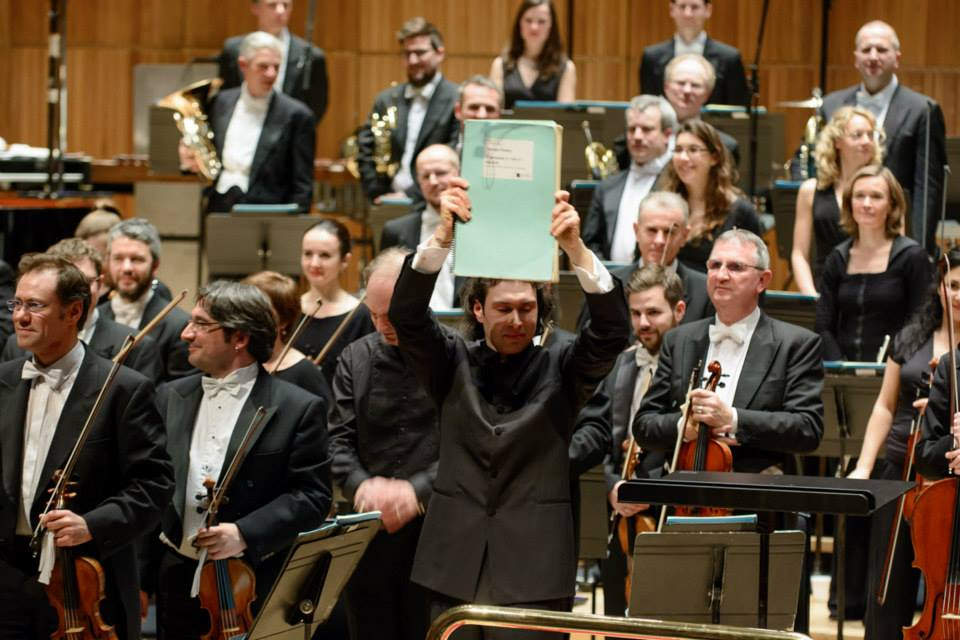
Dirijorul Vladimir Jurowski ridicind partitura enesciana pe scena Royal Festival Hall din Londra

== History ==
=== 1958 - First edition ===
The official opening day of the festival took place on 4 September 1958, merely three years after George Enescu's death, thus marking the official debut of the most important international musical manifestation hosted by Romania. The festival was meant to occur once every three years, being accompanied by an international competition, that was interrupted after the 5th edition, only to be reintroduced in the festival in 1991.

Among the music world's personalities that were present for this first edition of the show were performers such as Yehudi Menuhin, David Oistrah, Halina Czerny-Stefanka, Nadia Boulanger, Monique Haas, Iacov Zak and Claudio Arrau, and conductors such as Sir John Barbirolli, Carlo Felice Cillario and Carlo Zecchi.

On 22 September of the same year, the national premiere of George Enescu's lyrical tragedy "Oedipe" took place, starring a young David Ohanesian in the lead role. This role was going to mark out the rest of his career as a soloist (conductor: Constantin Silvestri, Directed by: Jean Ranzescu, Scenery: Roland Laub).

=== 1961 - Second edition ===
Compared to the first one, the second edition paid much more attention to repertoires from the lyrical theatre and vocal art. This initiative was supported by several renowned soloists such as Dimitr Uzunov, Ivan Petrov and Anton Dermota. Five lyrical spectacles were presented by the Bucharest Theatre of Opera and Ballet: "Oedipe" by George Enescu, "Boris Godunov" by Modest Mussorgski, "Fidelio" by Ludwig van Beethoven, "Othello" by Giuseppe Verdi and "O Noapte Furtunoasă" by Paul Constantinescu, alongside two ballet acts in the forms of "La Piata" by Mihai Jora and "Priculiciul" by Zeno Vancea.

For the first time, there were opened three new concert halls: the Grand Hall of the Palace, the Small Hall of the Palace (now the Auditorium Hall) and the Concert Studio of the Romanian Radiotelevision (now the Mihail Jora Concert Studio).

In this edition participated the following: Sviatoslav Richter, Aldo Ciccolini, Leonid Kogan, Henryk Szeryng, Valentin Gheorghiu, Ştefan Gheorghiu, Vladimir Orlov, Radu Aldulescu, Ion Voicu, Sir John Barbirolli (his second time at the George Enescu Festival), Lorin Maazel, Ghenadi Rojdestvenski with George Georgescu, Mircea Cristescu, Mircea Basarab, Iosif Conta and Mihai Brediceanu.

=== 1964 – The Third Edition ===
The third edition debuted with a regrettable event – the death of the conductor George Georgescu, a few days after the beginning of the international event, depriving the Romanian stage of an indisputable artist.

The success of the previous editions was reconfirmed in 1964 mainly by the presence of exceptional international artists such as: Arthur Rubinstein, Henryk Szering, Gaspar Cassado, Monique Haas, Miroslav Ceangalovici, André Navarra, André Cluytens, Herbert von Karajan, Zubin Mehta and John Pritchard. Beside them there were also Romanian artists such as Valentin and Ştefan Gheorghiu, Ştefan Ruha, Ion Voicu, Radu Aldulescu, Vladimir Orlov, Mircea Basarab and Mihai Brediceanu.

It was an edition of first auditions, among the most important being the interpretations of the poem Vox Maris (by the Radiotelevision Orchestra, conducted by Iosif Conta) and the Piano Quartet no. 1, both signed by George Enescu.

=== 1967 – 4th Edition ===
During the 1967 festival, a great importance was given again to promoting both Enescian music and Romanian contemporary creations. It was one of the editions when the highest number of George Enescu's musical pieces was auditioned (12) and when 18 Romanian composers were included in the concert programs.

This edition also brought the first world audition of the Enescian creation: "Trio in A minor for violin, cello and piano". Other important first auditions were: "String Quartet No. 2" by Mihail Jora, "String Quartet No. 7" by Wilhelm Berger and "Scene nocturne" by Anatol Vieru.

Besides the presence of Romanian orchestras and artists (Valentin Gheorghiu, Ion Voicu, Radu Aldulescu, Mircea Basarab, Constantin Bugeanu and Antonin Ciolan, the "George Enescu" Philharmonic Orchestra, the Radiotelevision Orchestra, the Philharmonic Orchestra in Cluj, the Madrigal Choir, the "George Enescu" Quintet or the "Muzica Quartet"), international performers or ensembles were also present, such as Los Angeles Philharmonic, Moscow State Philharmonic, Grand Paris Opera Ballet, Czech Nonet and Tatrai Quartet. These ones and other artists such as Van Cliburn, Isaac Stern, Claire Bernard, Friedrich Gulda, David Oistrah, Mstislav Rostropovich, Zubin Mehta, Kiril Kondrashin and Kurt Masur have filled the concert halls once again.

=== 1970 – 5th Edition ===
Due to the Beethoven bicentenary, an initial characteristic of this edition was the massive presence of the creation of Bonn titan – 12 works interpreted – during the festival.

According to this and considering Enescu's affinity for the great classic, the Research Sector of the History of Art Institute, part of the Academy of Social and Political Sciences and the "George Enescu" Studies Center organized a round table with the theme "George Enescu and the Beethovian tradition".

The international personalities who performed in 1970 on the Bucharest stages were Paul Badura- Skoda, Gyorgy Cziffra, Henryk Szeryng, Mstislav Rostropovich, Nicanor Zabaletta, Jean Pierre Rampal, who replaced Valentin Gheorghiu (who became unavailable in the last minute), Virginia Zeani, Paul Klecky and André Previn. If in the previous editions the range of instruments was reduced to piano, violin and cello, during this edition a greater variety was observed, by inviting the most notable harpist of the time, Nicanor Zabaletta, and the legendary flautist Jean Pierre Rampal.

Probably the most important symphonic ensemble was the London Symphony Orchestra for which the Palace Grand Hall proved to be too small. Besides these two, other orchestras were also present such as the Opera and Ballet Theatre Orchestra in Leningrad, the Bach Gewandhaus Orchestra in Leipzig and other chamber orchestras, such as the Juilliard American Quintet and the Gasparo da Salo Chamber Orchestra.

=== 1973 – 6th Edition ===
The sixth edition of the International Festival "George Enescu" was reduced to only one week, due to the discomfort presented by the political authorities, who considered an artistic manifestation of this kind to be a useless investment.

Among the international soloists and conductors present this year were: Leonid Kogan, who replaced Sviatoslav Richter, who was supposed to perform in the opening concert, Yehudi Menuhin, Philippe Entremont, Ghenadi Rojdestvenski and Radmila Bakocevici.

Artists were invited exclusively on political criteria, most of them coming from socialist countries or from the ones sympathizing with the doctrine of the communist government. Three from the five international orchestras come from the communist countries.

=== 1976 – 7th Edition ===
This year, the Festival did not include a competition and an organizing committee. Also, the International Musicology Symposium did not benefit from the participation of international researchers, becoming a national symposium.

The soloists and the orchestras invited to participate in the festival were again selected based on political criteria. Among the notable international personalities, the Romanian public could attend the concerts of Pierre Cochereau, Christian Ferras, Grace Bumbry, Victoria de Los Angeles, and Elisabeth Schwarzkopf, three years before the retirement of the great artist.

There were four international ensembles present: the Hungarian Symphony Radiotelevision Orchestra in Budapest, the Madrigals in Belgrad, Moscow Chamber Orchestra and the "Studio der Frühen Musik" Vocal-Instrumental Quartet.

Among the Romanian artists could be mention: Radu Lupu, Ştefan Ruha, Ludovic Bacs, Mircea Basarab, Mihai Brediceanu, Iosif Conta, Emil Simion and Cornel Trăilescu.

=== 1979 – 8th Edition ===
The Festival "George Enescu" was becoming rather a national manifestation, as a shadow of the Competition "Cântarea României", which could thus celebrate its laureates at an international artistic level. Despite this drawback, this year's edition had a few remarkable guests, such as Nikita Magaloff, Viktor Tretiakov, Ludwig Hölscher and Sheila Armstrong.

The international instrumental ensembles that came to Bucharest had a chamber music repertoire (Deutsche Kammerakademie, the Sextet Gabrielli Brass Ensemble and the Contemporary Music Atelier in Poland). A novelty was the presence of two choreographical ensembles: Alvin Ailey Ballet Company from the US and Miyagi Minoru Traditional Dance Troupe from Japan.

=== 1981 – 9th Edition ===
Although the organizers did not dispose of great funds, they made efforts to start this edition, with the occasion of the 100 years anniversary from the birth of George Enescu.

Some of the international personalities present were: Annerose Schmidt, François Joël Thiollier, Vladimir Spivakov, Emil Ceakarov, Isaac Karabtchiewisky and Herbert Kegel.

Three of the seven musical troupes present in the festival were choreographical ensembles: Eurythmeum Troupe from Stuttgart, Lar Lubovitch Company and Sopianae Ballet Company.

The critics had very good reviews for the Great Academic Theatre Ensemble of URSS which performed "The Queen of Spades" and "Iolanta" by Peter Ilyich Tchaikovsky and "Mozart and Salieri" by Nikolai Rimsky-Korsakov, along with other famous pieces of the Russian, Italian and French romantic lyrical repertoire.

From the Romanian personalities present at the festival we mention: Valentin Gheorghiu, Dan Grigore, Radu Lupu, Ion Voicu and many names of the lyrical stage such as: Victoria Mann, Emilia Petrescu, Mihaela Agachi, Ionel Pantea, Florin Diaconescu.

=== 1985 – 10th Edition ===
An unprecedented number of Romanian creations was registered at the 10th edition, being interpreted 80 contemporary works, an impressive number, considering that in the program were included only 76 Romanian composers.

The Enescian creation was also generously represented, 25 works were interpreted, the highest number registered until then. Highly appreciated interpretations of the Enescian works were performed, among others, by Cristian Mandeal ("Third Suite") and Ion Baciu ("Second Symphony").

Internationally reputed interprets performing in the Festival were: Viktor Tretiakov, Siegfried Lorenz, Herbert Kaliga, Rudolf Innig, Jose Miguel Moreno Aguado and Jean Périsson. There were only two international instrumental ensembles in this edition, due to limited funds, the Dolezal Quartet from Czechoslovakia and Brodsky Quartet from Great Britain.

=== 1988 – XI Edition ===
The 1988 edition took place during the Romanian Antheneum Centenary. Also, 120 years from the foundation of the "George Enescu" Philharmonic was celebrated that year.

From the peak of the interpretative moments of George Enescu's creation we mention: "Symphony I" conductor Mihai Brediceanu, "Vox Maris" symphonic poem conducted by Iosif Conta, "Rapsody I" conducted by Yekoslav Sutej and "Two Intermezzi for String Orchestra" – Târgu-Mureș Chamber Orchestra.

The international personalities who participated in this edition were Georges Pludermacher, Michael Roll, Levon Ambartumian and Ferdinang Klinda.

During the festival, original moments were offered by Alexander Rudin, present both as a pianist and a cellist, in two concerts by J. Haydn and the French conductor Francoise Legrande.

=== 1991 – XII Edition ===
Starting with this edition, the first after the events of December 1989, the International Festival "George Enescu" begins to recapture its former glory.

The combined efforts of the organizing institutions succeeded to bring to Bucharest international renowned guests. It was a new beginning, which resulted, in the coming editions, in an array of famous international music names.

From the guest artists we mention: Mathias Weber, Jean Francois Antionioli, Gerhard Oppitz, Teiko MaMaehashi, Carlos Paita, Levon Ambartumian and Michiyoshi Inoue.

Yolanda Marculescu, who had been the prima dona of the Romanian National Opera of Bucharest from 1948 to 1968, was invited to return to Romania as a juror in 1991.

The Theatre of Classical Ballet from Kiev, the Moscow Chamber Orchestra, the Percussionists from Hague, the Saint Martin in the Fields Chamber Orchestra, Rheinisches Barocktrio, and Concerto Averna from Warsaw were the international ensembles present in the festival.A distinctive feature of this festival was the presence of works such as "Missa Brevis" by Joseph Haydn, "Requiem" by Mozart, "Palestrina Missa Brevis" operas impossible to interpret in the communist era.

=== 1995 – 13th Edition ===
The allocated funds, the facilities and the authorities' desire to create a new international image of Romania in the 90's, led to organizing the 13th edition at incredible high standards. Thus, through the Government's Decision nr. 364/30 from 1995, the amount of 2.690.488 RON (approx. $2 million) was approved for organizing the festival, to which the financial support of the Romanian Radiotelevision Society was added.

Important international names participated in this edition, such as: Lord Yehudi Menuhin, Lorin Maazel, Georges Pretre, Zubin Mehta, Yuri Temirkanov, Roberto Benzi, Sergiu Comissiona, Alberto Lissy, Ghenadi Rojdestvenski, Jean Pierre Rampal, the Royal Philharmonic Orchestra in London, the Bavarian Radio Symphony Orchestra, the Saint Petersburg Symphony Orchestra, the Israel Philharmonic Orchestra, the Stuttgart Radio Symphony Orchestra and the Radio Television Orchestra in Madrid, along with the most important Romanian soloists and instrumental and vocal ensembles.

One of the most controversial moments of this edition was the putting in stage of George Enescu's opera "Oedipe" by Andrei Şerban. In this version, the key role was interpreted by two soloists: Sever Barnea – young Oedipe and Nicolae Urdareanu – old Oedipe. Andrei Şerban gave the spectacle strong political connotations, which led to inevitable reactions.

=== 1998 – 14th Edition ===
In 1998, the anniversary of 40 years since the first International Festival "George Enescu" was celebrated. Complementary activities took place at the same time with the international event: recitals and concerts performed during the series "Romanian Music of the 20th century" (with the support of the National Radio Orchestra and the ensembles Archaeus, Concordia, Contraste, Romantica, Trio Modus), series entitled "Bach by Midnight", the International Seminar "George Enescu and the music of the 20th century" and the International Seminar I.A.M.A. with the theme "Development Directions of Managerial Cultural Exchanges".

Twelve international music troupes participated in this year's edition: the BBC Symphony Orchestra, the Symphony Orchestra from Chicago, the Tonhalle Zurich Orchestra, the French National Orchestra, the Symphony Orchestra from Koln, the Barcelona Symphony Orchestra, The Budapest Festival Orchestra, the Jerusalem Symphony Orchestra, the Moscow Virtuosi Orchestra, The Accademia Nazionale di Santa Cecilia Orchestra from Rome, the Kremarata Baltika Chamber Orchestra and the Alban Berg Quartet.

From the interprets and soloists present we mention: Viktoria Mullova, Gidon Kremer, Misha Maisky, Peter Donhoe, Peter Zimmermann, Shlomo Minz, Barbara Hendricks, Vladimir Spivakov, Yan Pascal Tortellier, Lawrence Foster, Daniel Barenboim, Lord Yehudi Menuhin, for the last time in front of the Romanian public, the maestro passed the following year.

=== 2001 – 15th Edition ===
The 2001 edition was by far the richest and most glamorous of all 15 editions of the festival. A lot of prestigious international artists performed on the Bucharest stages during the three-week festival. Among the participants of the 15th edition were: Hélène Grimaud, Vasko Vasiliev, Jean-Phillippe Collard, Rudolf Buchbinder, Maurice Andre, Maxim Vengerov, Pierre Amoyal, Isabelle Faust, Christian Zacharias, Cristoph Eschenbach, Laurent Petitgrard, Kurt Masur, Claus Peter Flor, Alexandros Myrat, Michel Plasson, Seiji Ozawa, Ghenadi Rojdestvenski, Leopold Hager, Sakari Oramo and Riccardo Mutti.

Beside these world-renowned personalities were prestigious instrumental ensembles such as: the Paris Orchestra, the London Philharmonic Orchestra, the Russian State Symphony Chapel, the Hamburg Radio Orchestra, Orchestre National du Capitole de Toulouse, City of Birmingham Symphony Orchestra, Vienna Philharmonic Orchestra, Penderecki Festival Orchestra, Orchestre de Chambre de Lausanne, London Chamber Orchestra, "Sine Nomine" Quartet.

The "By Midnight" concert series continued in this edition starting with Wolfgang Amadeus Mozart, 17 operas were interpreted.

=== 2003 – 16th Edition ===
The organizers concentrated on promoting the contemporary Romanian creations, through the series entitled "Romanian Music of the 20th Century", during which important operas could be listened to, signed mostly by the most appreciated and prestigious Romanian composers.

The International Contest "George Enescu" was organized a week before the Festival, allowing the finale and the Gala Concert to be included in the festival program. Similar to the precedent edition, the series "Midnight Concerts" continued, this year's focus being on Ludwig van Beethoven ("Beethoven by Midnight"), 26 of his works being interpreted.

In 2003, there was an initiative to organize concerts in the Festival Plaza, idea which continued in the following editions. Therefore, the International Festival "George Enescu" symbolically greeted potential audiences, facilitating the access to classical music to those unfamiliar with the genre.

The artistic excellence of the participants was confirmed also during this edition, when 11 international symphony orchestras performed, with Sir Collin Davis as conductor, the Orchestra of the Maggio Musicale Fiorentino (conducted by Zubin Mehta, a familiar presence in the program of the International Festival "George Enescu"), the Nazionale di Santa Cecilia Orchestra from Rome (with Myung Whun Chung as conductor), the Helsinki Philharmonic Orchestra (conducted by Leif Segerstam), the Royal Stockholm Orchestra (conducted by Alain Gilbert) or the Vienna Symphony Orchestra (conducted by Vladimir Fedoseev). The public could also see perform the Gulbenkian Orchestra from Lisbon or the Britten Sinfonia Ensemble from Great Britain.

=== 2005 – 17th Edition ===
The 2005 edition was organized for the commemoration of 50 years from the passing of the great composer. The objectives were to present and promote the Enescian creation to the prestigious artists invited, to promote the contemporary Romanian creations, to include the precedent editions laureates in the festival program and to open the festival to a jazz repertoire.

As a premier, for this edition there were presented three important elements: Johann Sebastian Bach's Brandenburg concertos and orchestral suites, performed by King's Consort ensemble and Ludwig van Beethoven's concertos for piano, with Christian Zacharias as soloist. Besides King's Consort ensemble and Christian Zacharias, in this edition also participated: Kirov Theatre Symphony Orchestra with conductor Valery Gergiev, Israel Philharmonic Orchestra conducted by Zubin Mehta, and Nigel Kennedy.

=== 2007 – 18th Edition ===
This edition's pleasant surprises were offered by the Oslo Philharmonic Orchestra conducted by Jukka-Pekka Saraste, Murray Perahia, Martha Argerich, Trio Beaux Arts and the violinist Joshua Bell who replaced Maxim Vegherov (unavailable). The absence of the masterpiece "Oedipe" on the festival banners was criticized.

Similar to the precedent edition, the variety of the repertoire can be noticed, great symphony hits or concerts were accompanied by other names, some of them quasi-famous to the large audience, coming from either the areas of old music, or from the most innovative areas of the contemporary music. This change is due to the type of ensembles invited, some of them being specialized in interpreting historical repertoires and others in contemporary ones.

George Enescu's compositions were also present in this year's program.

=== 2009 – 19th Edition ===
The debut at the end of August was a premiere for this edition, which had seven musical themed directions ("Romanian Contemporary Creation", "Enescu and His Contemporaries", "Midnight Concerts", "Classical Themes in Modern Interpretation", "Opera and Ballet", "Great Orchestras" and "Chamber Concerts") and a long and consistent program. The complexity of the repertoire, a feature of the previous festival editions, reached its peak this year.

The fact that in 2007, "Oedipe" opera was not included on the festival banners led to criticism, therefore, this year's edition debuted with this spectacle, a co-production of the Capitole Theatre in Toulouse and the Romanian Opera in Bucharest.

The commemoration of 200 years from the passing of Joseph Haydn in 2009, concluded in Haydn being the second composer in the top of works included in the festival program.

The Lausanne Chamber Orchestra, conducted by Christian Zacharias performed the music of the great Austrian maestro for three evenings, and was joined by the Ensemble le Musiciens du Loubre, the Royal Concertgebouw Orchestra Amsterdam and the Munich Philharmonic Chamber Orchestra.

The novelty of this edition was the concert series "Classical Themes in Modern Interpretation" as an alternative for jazz and world music lovers. From this series concert we mention Uri Caine and his troupe, Florin Răducanu.

=== 2011 - The 20th Edition ===
The 20th edition of the George Enescu International Festival and Competition presented and promoted the Enescu's works, the artistic and interpretative values of contemporary Romanian music, provided prestigious platform for launching value interpreters from among the younger generation and promoted the winners of previous editions.

Among participating groups: Wiener Philharmoniker / Franz Welser Möst, Israel Philharmonic Orchestra / Zubin Mehta, Yefim Bronfman, Vadim Repin, Staatskapelle Berlin / Daniel Barenboim Orchestra Accademia Nazionale di "Santa Cecilia" of Rome / Antonio Pappano, Orchestre National de France / Daniele Gatti, London Symphony Orchestra, Mariinsky Orchestra / Valery Gergiev, Liverpool Philharmonic Orchestra, Resident Orkestr / Christian Badea, Hungarian National Philharmonic / Zoltan Kocsis, Boris Berezovsky, Gulbenkian Symphony Orchestra / Lawrence Foster, Saint Martin in the Fields / Murray Perahia, Yundi, Isabelle Faust, Christian Zacharias, Sisters Labeque, Gidon Kremer, Helene Grimaud, David Garrett etc. with artists and bands from Romania: Dan Grigore, Horia Andreescu, Cristian Mandeal, Dana Borşan, Luiza Borac Voces Quartet, Alexandru Tomescu, Philharmonic "George Enescu" National Radra.

The joint concerts in the series entitled "Enescu and his contemporaries" continued, including chamber works in the interpretation of young soloists. Internationally renowned ensembles performed as "Great international orchestras" and "Chamber concerts", along with opera and ballet performances.

A series dedicated to contemporary music - "Music of the 21st century" - brought together works by Romanian and foreign contemporary composers. The works were presented by bands and singers in Romania and abroad. The series was accompanied by a "workshop" attended by 17 young composers, master and doctoral university attendees from the country.

A new entry in the Festival's program was the series "World Music", related to one of the essential contributions made by Enescu's Universal Music: use of specific national musical elements through symphony processing. This series was attended by composers and ensembles that brought elements from the Indian, Japanese, Argentinean, Yiddish, Lebanese, Moroccan and Romanian music.

There were 8 theaters and concert halls (Hall of the Palace, Romanian Athenaeum, Bucharest National Opera, National Theatre "I. L Caragiale" National Art Museum Hall, "Mihail Jora" Hall at the Romanian Radio Society, Small Hall of the Romanian Athenaeum, National University of Music Bucharest) and an outside stage in The Festival's Square. There were over 160 artistic events including 8 Romanian music concerts, 13 chamber concerts, 20 "Great International Orchestras"concerts, 6 concerts in the series "Enescu and his contemporaries", 10 concerts in the "World Music" series, 5 opera events, 5 ballets shows, 37 concerts as a part of the international competition, 64 events in Festival Square, 8 conferences in the musicology Symposium.

Other 23 concerts were held in the rest of the country, in Arad, Busteni, Cluj Napoca, Craiova, Iași, Sibiu, Târgu Mureș and Timișoara. The festival also hosted an art exhibition named "E-Biennial", in collaboration with the National Museum of Art, Museum of the Romanian Peasant, Ann Art and the Bucharest University of Arts.

=== 2013 - The 21st edition ===
The XXI edition of the "George Enescu" International Festival, held between 1 and 28 September 2013 brought together in Bucharest famous artists and orchestras like Concertgebouw Amsterdam, Staatskapelle Berlin, London Philharmonic, Münchener Philharmoniker, Royal Philharmonic London, Royal Stockholm Philharmonic and Academy Saint Martin in the Fields.

Some of the most important personalities of the international classical music were present on the Festival scene: the conductors Daniel Barenboim and Mariss Jansons, the pianists Radu Lupu, Murray Perahia, Pinchas Zuckerman, Maxim Vengerov and Evgeny Kissin.

For the XXI edition of the Festival there are artists and groups who came for the first time in Romania: Rundfunk Sinfonieorchester Berlin (the orchestra interpreted Wagner's tetralogy for the first time at Bucharest, in the last 50 years), Pittsburgh Symphony Orchestra, National Philharmonic of Russia, Harmonius Chamber Orchestra – Osaka, Camerata Salzburg, Vortice Dance Company and the famous actor John Malkovich, the narrator of The Infernal Comedy - Confessions of a Serial Killer, interpreted by Wiener Akademie. As a reconfirmation of Festival's value, famous orchestras like Royal Concertgebouw Amsterdam and Staatskapelle Berlin, Academia Santa Cecilia di Roma returned in Romania in 2013.

Another premiere of the XXI edition was the Bucharest transformation into a magical space, in a capital of creativity. Creative Bucharest is an original project developed during the festival in order to show our cultural heritage and the joy and creative spirit of the Romanians.

There were over 150 cultural events that took place in Bucharest, Arad, Bacău, Cluj, Craiova, Dorohoi, Iași, Oradea, Sibiu and Timișoara.

=== More recent festivals ===
The festival continues to be held regularly; the 2026 edition (described as the '20th edition of the competition') runs from 15 August to 19 September 2026. Composition competitions have been held in 2014, 2016, 2018, 2020/2021, 2022, 2024 and 2926.
