= George Georgescu =

Romanian conductor

George Georgescu

George Georgescu (September 12, 1887 – September 1, 1964) was a Romanian conductor. The moving force behind the Bucharest Philharmonic Orchestra for decades beginning shortly after World War I, a protégé of Artur Nikisch and a close associate of George Enescu, he received honors from the French and communist Romanian governments and lived to make recordings in the stereo era.

== Education and career as soloist ==
Georgescu was born in the river port of Sulina, Tulcea County, Romania on September 12, 1887. His father, Leonte, was head of customs, and his mother, Elena, was the daughter of the captain of the port. As Leonte took up positions in various ports along the Danube, the family moved to Galaţi and then Giurgiu. In Galaţi, the toddler George found and, placing it between his legs like a cello, began playing a violin that his father had won in a raffle; Leonte, who did not want his son to be a "fiddler", was not pleased, but nonetheless Georgescu began violin lessons at age five. Later, he would transfer his attention to the cello. While in elementary school, he composed a waltz that impressed the school's music teacher, who thereafter called on George as a substitute school choir director.

At age 18 Georgescu left from home and entered the Bucharest Conservatory as a student of the double bass; the teachers there, quickly recognizing his musical gifts, arranged for his transfer to the cello class of Constantin Dimitrescu. As Georgescu's father refused to provide financial support for musical studies, Georgescu supported himself by singing in a church choir and playing in an operetta orchestra. When the conductor of the latter ensemble, Grigore Alexiu, was abruptly taken ill, the players chose Georgescu to take his place, giving Georgescu the opportunity to make his first impression as an orchestra conductor.

Following his graduation in 1911, Georgescu moved to Berlin, having unexpectedly won a grant to study there through his performance in a recital at the Romanian Athenaeum. He enrolled in the Berlin Hochschule für Musik and continued his studies of cello with the prominent cellist Hugo Becker, as well as entering into studies of composition and conducting. Becker, much sought as a teacher, was reluctant at first, but in time, through Georgescu's persistence, recognized that Georgescu had the makings of an unusually fine, if not yet sufficiently disciplined, cellist. Later, Georgescu would credit Becker as the most important formative influence in his musical development. Georgescu began his professional career soon thereafter, replacing Becker in 1910 as cellist in the Marteau Quartet. He performed throughout Europe with this group for the next four years.

== Career change and the Interwar Years ==
Georgescu's career as a cellist came to an end late in World War I. He was interned for a time in Berlin as an enemy alien; although the local artistic community quickly obtained his release, Georgescu was still obligated to contact the police twice daily. More seriously, as he traveled to an engagement in 1916, a railway carriage door was closed on his hand, causing a painful injury that ultimately precluded his further performance on the cello. As that chapter in his life closed, however, a new one opened; Richard Strauss and Arthur Nikisch both advised him to take up conducting, advice that he quickly followed after coaching with the latter. Not long after a private appearance as conductor at the home of Franz von Mendelssohn, Georgescu made his public debut in that capacity on February 15, 1918, leading the Berlin Philharmonic Orchestra in Tchaikovsky's Pathétique Symphony, Grieg's Piano Concerto, and Richard Strauss's Till Eulenspiegel's Merry Pranks. There followed a year of performances with that ensemble, notable, inter alia, for including Claudio Arrau's Berlin debut.

=== Return to Romania ===
Georgescu continued his association with the Berlin Philharmonic through 1919, but in early 1920 he answered a patriotic call and returned to Romania. Dimitrie Dinicu, conductor of the Bucharest Philharmonic, had fallen seriously ill and asked Georgescu to replace him. Acceding to that request, Georgescu on January 4, 1920, led the first of what would be 22 concerts that year and hundreds over the next four decades with the orchestra. During this Romanian debut, the young maestro made a great impression on the Romanian king and queen, Ferdinand I and Maria, who were both in attendance. King Ferdinand was honorary president of the Philharmonic Society; Georgescu was named artistic director of that body a year after his debut with the orchestra, by virtue of which appointment he became its permanent conductor. In 1922, pursuant to a directive from King Ferdinand to expand the orchestra by recruiting elite musicians from abroad, Georgescu traveled to Vienna, and through ensuing auditions he built the orchestra up to a hundred members.

Back in Bucharest, Georgescu rehearsed and trained the enlarged ensemble to a high standard, sufficient to attract internationally celebrated guest conductors such as Richard Strauss, Bruno Walter, Felix Weingartner, Oskar Nedbal, and Gabriel Pierné; notable soloists who played with the orchestra included Yehudi Menuhin, Pablo Casals, Alfred Cortot, Wilhelm Backhaus, Jacques Thibaud, Arthur Rubinstein, and Georgescu's young countryman Dinu Lipatti. Repertoire was wide-ranging. Naturally, it included works of Romanian composers such as Marcel Mihalovici, Paul Constantinescu, Mihail Jora, and especially Georgescu's friend Georges Enescu. Otherwise, it ran the gamut from traditional masterworks in the central tradition to modern works by the likes of Richard Strauss, Maurice Ravel, Igor Stravinsky, Béla Bartók, and Vincent d'Indy. In 1926, during a visit to Paris, Georgescu developed an association with Les Six, further cementing his credentials as an exponent of modern literature. In recognition of his achievements, the French government created him an Officer of the Légion d'honneur.

Georgescu—who by the end of his first year in Bucharest had already demonstrated strong command of choral works, particularly Beethoven's Ninth Symphony—did not restrict his musical activities to orchestral music; he immersed himself in many facets of Romanian musical life. In the first few years after assuming the Philharmonic's helm, he also organized the first Romanian ballet school. Moreover, from 1922 to 1926, 1930 to 1933, and 1939 to 1940 he led the Romanian Opera in Bucharest. As at the Philharmonic, he directed a wide-ranging repertoire, which, in addition to a heavy emphasis on the works of Wagner, included Romanian works and more conventional fare such as Bizet's Carmen; Gounod's Faust; Verdi's Aida; Puccini's Tosca, Manon Lescaut, and La bohème; Mozart's The Magic Flute; Beethoven's Fidelio; Richard Strauss's Salome; Mussorgsky's Boris Godunov; and Tchaikovsky's Queen of Spades. Celebrated guest singers included the likes of Aureliano Pertile, Maria Cebotari, Tito Schipa, and Feodor Chaliapin; numbered among the conductors Georgescu invited to lead the opera company were Pietro Mascagni, Hugo Reichenberger, Felix Weingartner, and Clemens Krauss. At the other musical extreme, Georgescu enjoyed meeting with an informal group of friends who played the cimbalom for evenings of folk music.

=== Activities abroad ===
Although from 1920 Georgescu always centered his activities in Romania, and particularly on the Bucharest Philharmonic, he was also active abroad, over time building an enviable international reputation. As early as 1921, he conducted a series of concerts in France to enthusiastic reviews; he would return in 1926 and again in 1929, in the latter instance substituting for an indisposed Willem Mengelberg. One year after his first series of French appearances, he took the Bucharest Philharmonic to Istanbul and Athens. Georgescu also made guest appearances in Barcelona, where he performed at the invitation of Pablo Casals, and in Vienna, where his interpretation of music by Richard Strauss drew approbation from the formidable critic Julius Korngold. The most colorful of his ventures abroad, however, was his first visit to the United States in 1926.

Georgescu had taken a leave of absence from the Bucharest Philharmonic and settled in Paris, nominally to rest from his strenuous exertions of the immediately preceding years, although he nonetheless conducted concerts there with the Concerts Colonne orchestra. When he went to the train station to pay his respects to Queen Maria of Romania, who was passing through the city en route to the United States, she insisted that he should go there as well, even though he had no engagements and no reputation there through which to obtain any. As luck would have it, however, in New York he took up lodgings in close proximity to and made the acquaintance of Arthur Judson, manager of the New York Philharmonic and representative of, among others, Arturo Toscanini, who then shared the New York Philharmonic podium with Mengelberg. Thus, when issues of health compelled Toscanini to cancel his remaining appearances beginning in late 1926, Judson immediately thought of Georgescu as a potential replacement, albeit an unknown quantity. After obtaining reassurance from Richard Strauss, Judson recommended Georgescu for the position, and in December 1926 Georgescu made his US debut with the New York Philharmonic, scoring a critical success in music of Smetana, Schubert, and Richard Strauss. He would continue to conduct the orchestra for some months thereafter. Moreover, as in Romania, Georgescu offered his services in the cause of opera during his American sojourn. On January 20, 1927, he conducted a single performance of La bohème with the Washington National Opera, a struggling semi-professional company active in the US capital from 1919 to 1936 and not to be confused with the present company of the same name. Probably recruited at short notice because of Jacques Samossoud's abrupt departure from the company over a contract dispute, Georgescu received favorable notice in The Washington Post, which likened his style of conducting to that of Leopold Stokowski. Later, making his return to Europe, Georgescu traveled on the same ship as Toscanini, and the two former cellists developed a friendship.

If Georgescu went to America as an unknown quantity, his success there further enhanced his reputation at home, leading to numerous engagements throughout Europe over the next two decades. Of particular note, on January 6, 1933, he was the conductor of the Warsaw Philharmonic Orchestra when Henryk Szeryng made his formal debut at age 14 playing Brahms's Violin Concerto. In November 1935, the two would again perform that work in Szeryng's Romanian debut, this time with the Bucharest Philharmonic. The next day they repeated the performance at the royal palace for Queen Maria.

Georgescu also took his home orchestra on tour again, this time to the Eastern Mediterranean. Nor did he neglect his labors in the opera pit during travels abroad. He led performances of the unrevised Boris Godunov, then very much a novelty, in Italy, and he led Aida and La bohème in Berlin.

=== Personal life ===
Georgescu was attractive to women, and for a time in 1920 even exchanged love letters with Elisabeth, eldest daughter of Queen Maria, although for reasons of state their relationship was quashed. In 1933, by now already a widower, Georgescu married Florica Oroveanu. She was the adoptive daughter of the Minister of Public Works Constantine Busila and descended from Romanian aristocracy. Aged only 18, she was 25 years Georgescu's junior, and the marriage took place only after the couple overcame three years of opposition by her family. Tutu Georgescu, as she was known, would remain Georgescu's wife and staunch supporter for the rest of his life and would publish two volumes of memoirs devoted to preserving the memory of his art. Recognized as a musicologist in her own right, she outlived him by more than four decades, dying in 2008 at age 95.

== World War II and its aftermath ==
Romania's entry into World War II as an ally of Nazi Germany did little to slow Georgescu's activities at home or abroad. Georgescu took the Bucharest Philharmonic on a tour of Nazi-occupied countries to considerable critical acclaim. In 1942, he and the orchestra were recorded for the first time on the new medium of magnetic tape; the works performed were Enescu's First Symphony and two Romanian Rhapsodies. A year later, Georgescu presided over the concert debut of the Romanian pianist and composer Valentin Gheorghiu, then 15 years old.

Georgescu's fortunes, a largely unbroken string of successes for the preceding quarter century, would take a dramatically unfavorable turn in 1944, when Romania abruptly switched sides, joining the Allies. On the strength of his participation in the Nazi cultural and propaganda machine, the authorities branded Georgescu a collaborator and barred him "for life" from conducting in Romania. Succeeding him at the Bucharest Philharmonic, after two brief caretaker regimes, was Constantin Silvestri, whose conducting talents Georgescu himself had discovered a few years earlier. Moreover, the government confiscated property from Tutu's family and in the fall of 1944 arrested Constantin Busila, her adoptive father, who was convicted to prison as a war criminal and would die in prison five years later.

== Later career ==
Only in 1947 would Georgescu begin to reconstruct his life and career as, with the intercession of his friend George Enescu, he was named director of the National Radio Orchestra of Romania, ironically the same ensemble with which Silvestri had made his conductorial debut. At this time Georgescu also directed the Iaşi "Moldova" Philharmonic Orchestra, and his international career began to revive with invitations to conduct in Prague and Kiev. He also again began associating with opera, advocating the revised edition of Paul Constantinescu's O noapte furtunoasa after its 1951 premiere during the Romanian Music Week. As their fortunes stabilized, the Georgescus opened their house to shelter destitute families and reached out to assist friends in distress.

Georgescu's exile from the Bucharest Philharmonic ended when Silvestri stepped down in 1953, leading to an invitation on December 11 for Georgescu to return as director. In 1955, he presided over the orchestra's name change to honor his friend George Enescu, who had recently died an exile in France; henceforth, the orchestra would be the George Enescu Philharmonic.

In many ways, upon his return to the Philharmonic, Georgescu picked up where he had left off a decade earlier. He continued his painstaking work of orchestra building; his constant efforts to attract internationally recognized soloists, which led to collaborations with the likes of David Oistrakh, Sviatoslav Richter, and Yehudi Menuhin; and his advocacy for younger Romanian talent, including Lola Bobescu, Valentin Gheorghiu, Ştefan Gheorghiu, Radu Aldulescu, Ştefan Ruha, and Ion Voicu. Voicu, whom Mengelberg had first elevated from orchestral player to soloist in dramatic circumstances, gave his first performance with the Philharmonic in 1949 under Georgescu's direction, and when he performed with the same forces in Belgrade in 1957, the cheering audience refused to leave the hall until threatened with firehoses; he would go on to become the orchestra's director for a decade beginning in 1972.

Georgescu's activities abroad, both with and without the Philharmonic, were not limited to Belgrade. Under his renewed direction, the orchestra traveled to Finland; Sweden; the Soviet Union; Berlin; Dresden; Vienna; and Athens, where it performed to great acclaim at the Odeon of Herodes Atticus. It received a 25-minute ovation when it performed at the 1956 Autumn Festival in Warsaw, devoted to contemporary works.

Georgescu kept up an active schedule of guest appearances with orchestras in countries such as Italy, England, France, and Poland. In Hungary, Georgescu conducted for the first time in the presence of Zoltán Kodály; upon hearing Georgescu in Prague, Evgeny Mravinsky hailed him as a leading exponent of Beethoven and Tchaikovsky. In 1960, Georgescu returned to the United States, and on December 13, 14, and 15 of that year he conducted the National Symphony Orchestra in Washington, D.C. The program included Prokofiev's Symphony No. 1, Enescu's Romanian Rhapsody No. 1, and Richard Strauss's Ein Heldenleben. The same US tour included engagements with the Cleveland and Philadelphia Orchestras and the New York Philharmonic. Three years later, Georgescu made his British debut at the Royal Festival Hall.

Not all of Georgescu's notable activities were conductorial. Before the American tour, for instance, Georgescu had already taken part in an event that greatly affected the United States. In 1958 he served as a member of the jury of the newly created International Tchaikovsky Competition, which, in a decision made more dramatic by the tensions of the Cold War, awarded first prize to the young American Van Cliburn. Although Cliburn's performance, featuring Tchaikovsky's First Piano Concerto, is best remembered, having been commemorated shortly after the event in a best-selling contemporary record, the Russians also arranged a concert for their visitor Georgescu with fellow jurist Sviatoslav Richter. Also in 1958, Georgescu, as a tribute to George Enescu, organized the first George Enescu Festival, which remains a major Eastern European music festival and competition. Highlights included a performance of Bach's Concerto for Two Violins with Yehudi Menuhin and David Oistrakh as soloists and a staging of Enescu's sole opera, Œdipe, with Silvestri conducting.

Georgescu considered himself primarily a performing musician and did not pursue an academic career. Nonetheless, from 1950 to 1953 he did accept a position teaching the conducting class at the Bucharest Conservatory, where he had himself been a student nearly half a century earlier. His greater influence doubtless was through his support of young Romanian artists and his ceaseless efforts to build Romanian musical institutions of international caliber. Over the course of his career, he presided over the Romanian premieres of more than 400 works from the international literature and world premieres of more than 100 Romanian compositions, and he opened the way for other Romanian musicians, including Mihail Jora and Jonel Perlea. The Romanian government recognized his contributions by awarding him the Romanian State Prize in 1949 and 1957 and naming him a People's Artist of the Romanian People's Republic in 1954.

His last concert brought Georgescu full circle as he led the George Enescu Philharmonic in Berlin, the site of his conducting debut, in a program featuring violinist Christian Ferras. He was already suffering the debilitating effects of a heart attack, and his end was not far off. Georgescu died in a Bucharest hospital on September 1, 1964.

== George Georgescu Contest ==
In honor of Georgescu's memory, teachers at the Arts High School in Tulcea started organizing a Contest for Performing Artists in his name in 1992; it has taken place annually ever since. At first it was open only to Romanian music school and high school students, but in 1995 it was opened to international students as well and has come to be regarded as an important fixture on the Romanian musical landscape. Organizers include the Romanian Ministry of Education and Youth, the School Inspectorate of Tulcea County, the Tulcea County Council, the Tulcea Mayoralty, and surviving members of Georgescu's family.

== Recordings ==
Like his countryman Sergiu Celibidache, Georgescu found the process of making phonograph records uncongenial. The tedium of interruptions, retakes, trials to accommodate the setup of equipment, and the like were at odds with his temperament, which found greatest expressiveness when given free rein in the presence of an audience; moreover, he was concerned about the need for perfection when performances were fixed in a permanent medium. Unlike Celibidache, however, Georgescu did not benefit from extensive release of concert tapings; indeed many of his postwar broadcast tapes were erased. Thus, little of his art has been preserved in recordings.

Georgescu was represented during the 78 RPM era, when, for instance, he recorded Enescu's Poema Romana for HMV (AN 301, 12-inch). Unfortunately, death preempted plans, mediated by Toscanini's daughter Wally, for Georgescu to make records in 1963 and 1964 for RCA Victor. Therefore, the centerpiece of his recorded legacy is a complete stereo cycle of Beethoven symphonies with the George Enescu Philharmonic recorded by Electrecord in 1960, with later LP issues as Intercord 976 and Lingen Köln 1124; a compact disc release on Lys 485-490 apparently was dubbed from the Electrecord LPs. Though some collectors believe that the Lingen Koln issue is a separately recorded set done on tour, and not a re-issue of the Electrecord series, as they do not sound like the same performances, even allowing for transfer variability. Also of importance, given his closeness to the composer, is the recording of Enescu's First Symphony; after a performance of this work under Georgescu's direction in 1925, Enescu wrote Georgescu a letter marking the occasion as only the third or fourth time in his career that he had been understood. Otherwise, at least in the English-speaking world, Georgescu's name appears on CD primarily in connection with other, better-remembered musicians, as in his direction of the USSR State Orchestra partnering Sviatoslav Richter in a performance of Schumann's Piano Concerto in A Minor.

== Quotations ==
All I know, I learned from Hugo Becker.

— George Georgescu, on studying with the celebrated cellist

If I had not been a conductor, I would have liked to be a cardinal.

— George Georgescu in an interview

Long may you live, to the joy of Romanians and musicians.

— George Enescu, after a performance of his First Symphony on November 25, 1925
