= Ștefan Gheorghiu (violinist) =

Romanian musician (1926–2010)

Ştefan Gheorghiu (23 March 1926 – 17 March 2010) was a Romanian musician, violinist and teacher, born in Galați, Romania.

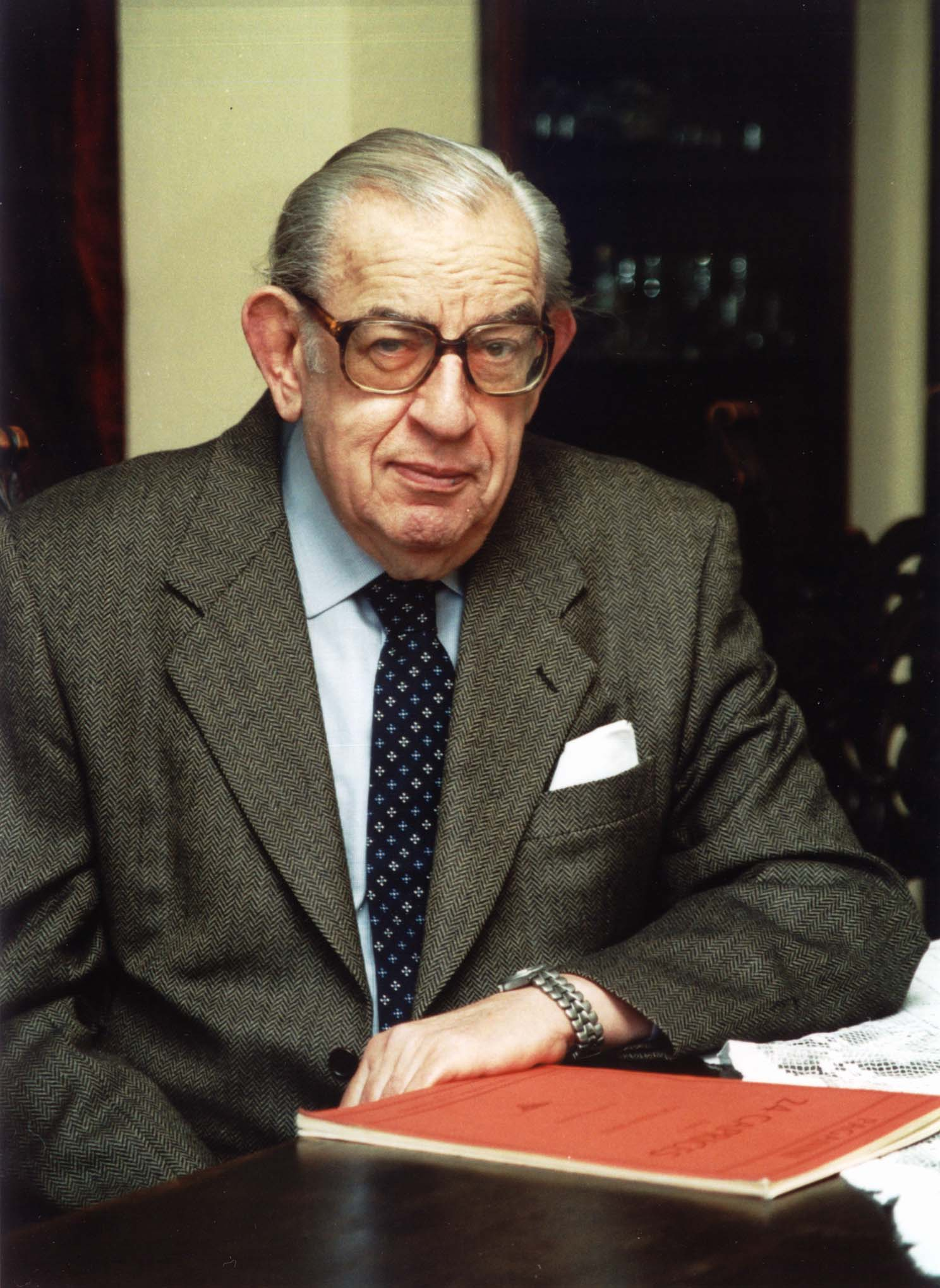
Professor Ștefan Gheorghiu

== Early life and education ==
At 5 he starts studying the violin and at 9 becomes student of the Royal Music Academy in Bucharest. George Enescu recommended him and his brother Valentin Gheorghiu - pianist, for a scholarship at the Conservatoire de Paris, where he studied the violin with Maurice Hewitt and musical harmony and counterpoint with Noel Gallon. During the war he continued studies in Bucharest with Garabet Avakian and Mihail Jora. Gheorghiu finished his studies in Moscow, attending the violin performing art masterclasses of David Oistrakh.

== Career ==
Since 1946 he was appointed concert-soloist of the State Philharmonic in Bucharest, where he performed both in symphonic concerts and in violin recitals. He was member of the Romanian Trio, together with Valentin Gheorghiu and Radu Aldulescu. At the first edition of the George Enescu International Competition in 1958, he won the first prize for the best performance of the third sonata by Enescu, together with his brother the pianist Valentin Gheorghiu. The jury consisted of Yehudi Menuhin, David Oistrakh, Henryk Szeryng, André Gertler, Nadia Boulanger and George Georgescu.

During his 40 years of concert activity, Stefan Gheorghiu played more than 2000 performances in his native country and touring in Europe, USA, Canada and Asia. Among the most important musical centers that had him as a guest were Paris, Menton, London, Manchester, Rome, Vienna, Salzburg, Locarno, Lausanne, Basel, Prague, Warsaw, Berlin, Munich, Leipzig, Moscow, Sankt Petersburg, Riga, Talin, Sofia, Athens, Thessaloniki, Montreal, San Francisco, Los Angeles, St. Louis, Boston, Peking, Shanghai. He worked together with conductors Frans Konwitschny, Constantin Silvestri, Kyrill Kondrashin, George Georgescu, Jean Périsson.

== Recordings ==
He made recordings for Electrecord (the Romanian home record), Supraphon and for other different radios across Europe. Stefan Gheorghiu made many first audition recordings of George Enescu's work: the piano quartet, the piano quintet, the chamber symphony (Grand Prix du Disque - Paris), "Impressions d'enfance", the third sonata.

His concert activity was doubled, starting with 1960 by the pedagogical one. He was a violin performing art professor at the National University of Music Bucharest. His remarkable results in developing of the young artists were awarded at many international violin competitions.

== Teaching ==
The list of his students includes:

- Corina Belcea
- Florin Croitoru
- Angèle Dubeau
- Silvia Marcovici
- Constantin Șerban
- Alexandru Tomescu
