= Washington National Opera (disambiguation) =

Washington National Opera may refer to:

- Washington National Opera, Washington DC opera company, established 1957
- Washington National Opera (1919-1936), former opera company, established 1919
- A metonym for the John F. Kennedy Center for the Performing Arts, where the Washington National Opera is based
