= Radu Aldulescu =

Radu Aldulescu may refer to:

- Radu Aldulescu (novelist) (born 1954), Romanian novelist
- Radu Aldulescu (musician) (1922–2006), Romanian-born Italian cellist
