= Aldulescu =

Aldulescu is a Romanian surname. Notable people with the surname include:

- Radu Aldulescu (born 1954), Romanian writer
- Radu Aldulescu (1922–2006), Romanian-born Italian cellist
