= Nicolae Păun =

Nicolae Păun may refer to:

- Nicolae Păun (politician)
- Nicolae Păun (footballer)
