= Ion Voicu =

Romanian violinist and conductor

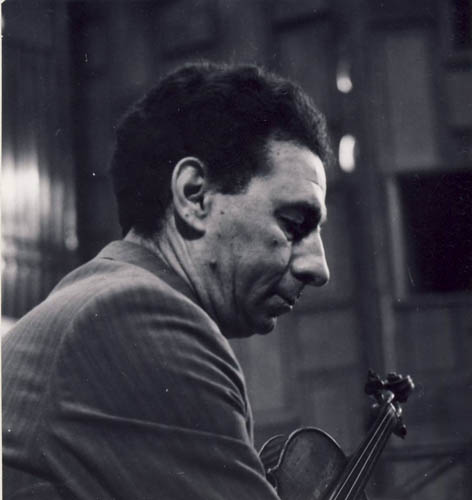
- Photographic portrait from the National History Museum of Romania collections

Background information
- Born: 8 October 1923 (age 102); Bucharest, Kingdom of Romania
- Died: 24 February 1997 (aged 73) Bucharest, Romania
- Genres: Classical
- Formerly of: Romanian Philharmonic Society

Ion Voicu (Romanian: [iˈon ˈvojku]; October 8, 1923 – February 24, 1997) was a Romanian violinist and orchestral conductor of Romani ethnicity. In 1969 he founded the award-winning Bucharest Chamber Orchestra, which is now conducted by his son Mădălin Voicu.

== Life ==
Voicu was born in Bucharest on 8 October 1923, into a family of professional musicians. His son was also born in Bucharest. At the age of 6, he had his first music lessons with Constantin Niculescu. At age 14, he entered the Royal Academy of Music in Bucharest, where he studied with George Enescu. After graduating in 1940, he became violinist with the National Radio Orchestra of Romania, where he was noticed by the conductor, Willem Mengelberg; Voicu made his debut as a soloist with the orchestra soon after. In 1946, he won the first prize at a musical competition organized in Bucharest by George Enescu and Yehudi Menuhin.

In 1949, Voicu first appeared as a soloist with the Romanian Philharmonic Society under George Georgescu, and he achieved great acclaim as a participant in their 1957 tour of Belgrade; from 1972 to 1982, he was the director of the Philharmonic.

The Ion Voicu Park in central Bucharest was named after him in 2003, as was the George Enescu Festival. Voicu died on 24 February 1997, also in Bucharest, at the age of 73.
