= Arnold Volpe =

Russian-born American composer and conductor (1869–1940)

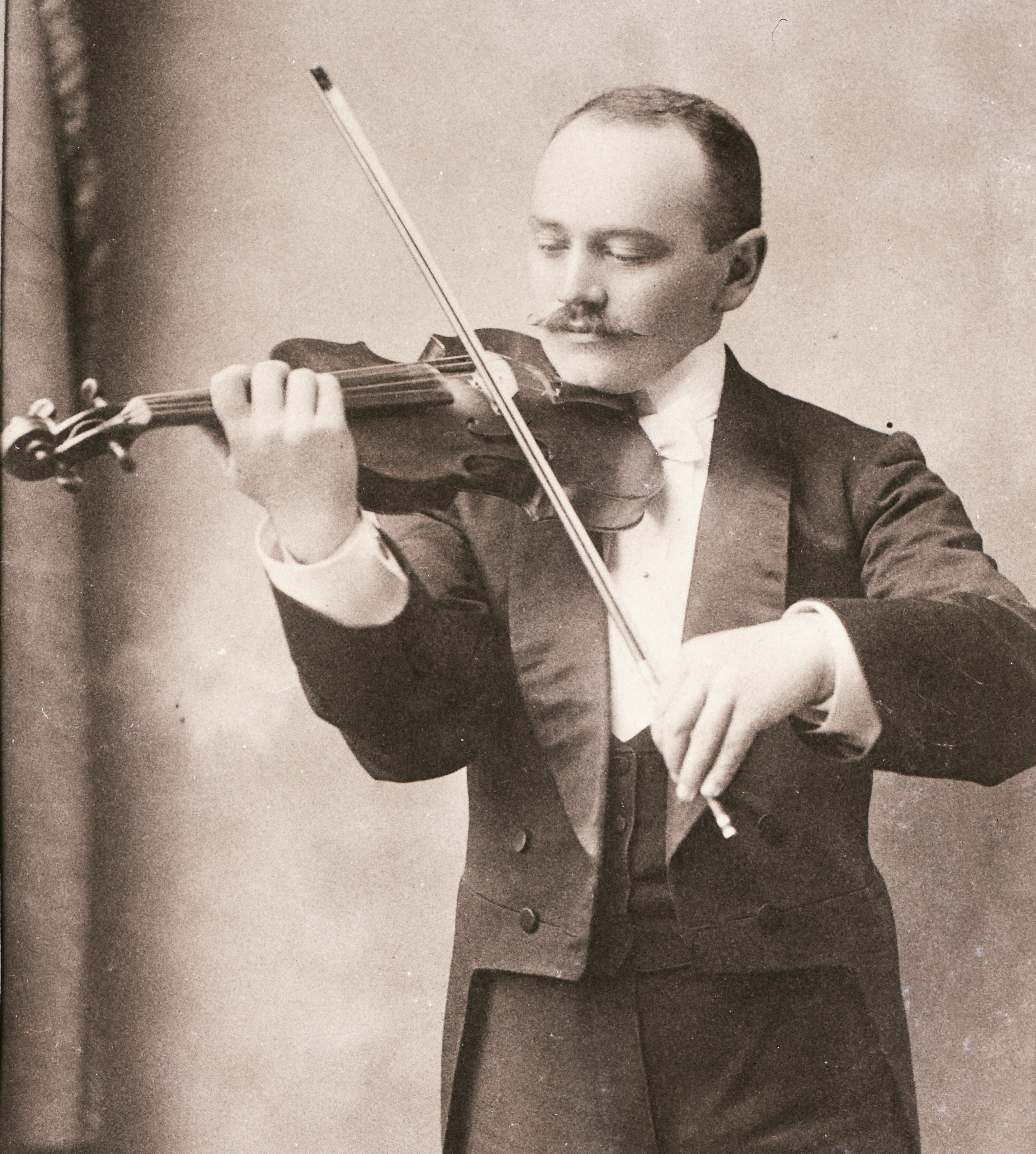
Studio photograph of Arnold Volpe

Arnold Volpe (July 9, 1869 – February 2, 1940) was a Russian-born American composer and conductor. He composed mainly chamber music, including a string quartet, as well as a mazurka for violin and orchestra. He founded both the Lewisohn Stadium Concerts in New York City and the symphony orchestra at the University of Miami, and he conducted five productions for the Washington National Opera, a semi-professional company founded in 1919 and not associated with its current namesake, beginning late in its first season. He was related to the composer Stefan Wolpe.

== Biography ==
=== Early life ===
Arnold was born Aaron-David Levy-Itzkovich Volpe in Kaunas, Kovno Governorate, Russian Empire on July 9, 1869. His parents were Lewis (Itsik Levik) Volpe and Ella (Elka Reiza) Gabrilowitsch. He was Jewish. He received his basic musical education at the Warsaw Conservatory in the 1880s. He then relocated to Saint Petersburg in 1887 to study violin at the Saint Petersburg Conservatory, where he became the protege of the director Anton Rubinstein. He studied there under Leopold Auer and Nikolai Galkin, graduating with high standing in May 1891. After a brief tour, at the suggestion of Rubinstein he returned to the conservatory and engaged in a deeper study of harmony and counterpoint with Nicolai Soloviev which lasted until 1897 when he graduated as a composer.

He emigrated to the United States in July 1898. His wife, who he married in New York in 1902, was named Marie Michelson and was also born in Kaunas. Volpe became a naturalized US citizen in 1911.

=== Music career ===
In New York in 1904 Volpe founded an orchestra for young musicians, the Arnold Volpe Symphony (sometimes called the Young Men's Symphony Orchestra), which eventually grew to a roster of 90 musicians. It was apparently founded and operated with the support of Alfred A. Seligman, a banker and amateur musician. Among the notable young musicians in his Symphony Orchestra were Richard Burgin and Nat Shilkret. The orchestra received good reviews for the high quality of its programming and performances. After Seligman died in a car accident in June 1912, a large donation of funds and his musical instrument collection passed on to the orchestra. At around that time, Volpe was advocating for more venues for sophisticated music for a broad audience, noting that popular tastes were changing. The orchestra disbanded in 1914. That same year Volpe and family traveled to Europe to visit relatives and musical acquaintances. Marie had planned to spend at least three years on the continent studying vocal technique. After visiting relatives in France and Belgium, they were in Austria when the First World War started. At first, Volpe was not worried, but as conditions deteriorated he retreated to London where the family sailed back to the United States.

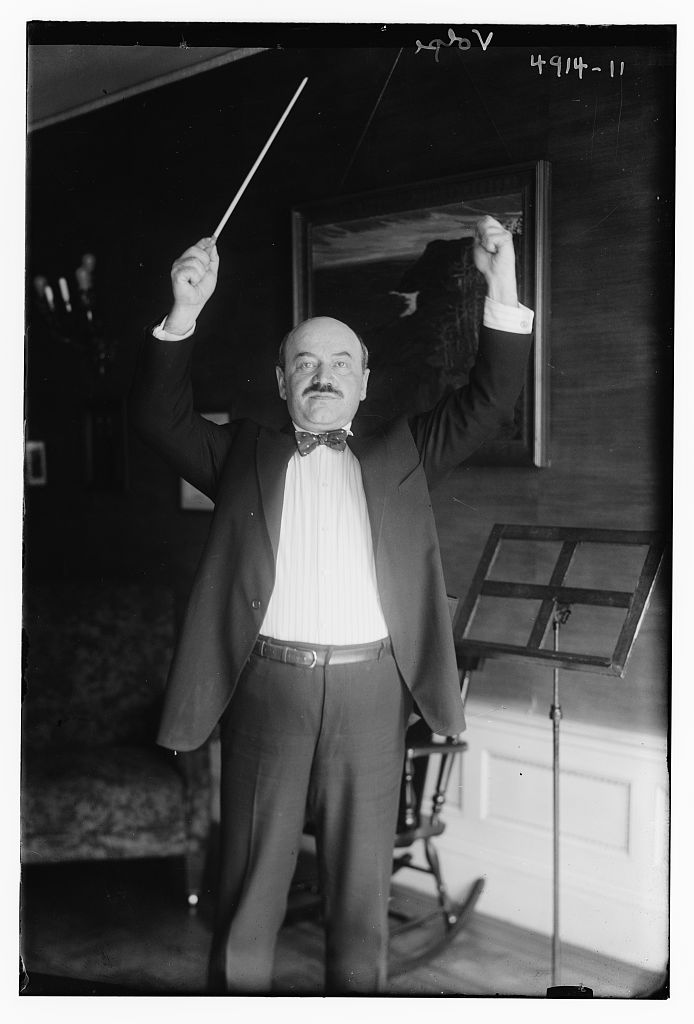
Arnold Volpe in 1919

In June 1918, with the support of philanthropist Minnie Guggenheimer, he became the first conductor at the new Lewisohn Stadium orchestra. According to Edwin Franko Goldman, big-band summer concert series of this type were still relatively new, and Volpe's was one of the first of its kind after Goldman's own. Rather than playing the type of stirring patriotic and popular music common to outdoor concerts, Volpe's idea was to present a more challenging programme of Classical and Operatic works to a broad audience. Although critics expected it to fail, it was very successful and attracted large audiences of thousands. After Volpe conducted it for its first two summer seasons, in 1920 Walter Henry Rothwell took it over, followed by Victor Herbert and Henry Hadley in 1922.

In 1922 he relocated with his family to Kansas City, Missouri where he became the new director of the Kansas City Conservatory of Music.

In 1925 he and his wife toured the west coast and he was guest conductor at the Hollywood Bowl for their summer concert series.

After that tour the family settled in Miami, Florida, where in 1926 Volpe helped found the Miami Symphony Orchestra and became an instructor in the University of Miami's music program.

He died on February 2, 1940, in Miami. A generous memorial fund was also set up in his name in 1940, to be administered by the university and a panel of musicians including Mischa Elman and Serge Koussevitzky The fund's mandate included the support of musical events at the university and the creation of a new building in the music department, the Arnold Volpe Building.

Marie Volpe died in 1970.
