= Theodor Rogalski =

Romanian composer (1901–1954)

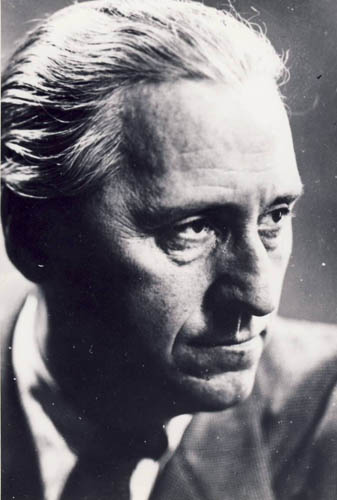
- Born: April 11, 1901; Bucharest, Romania
- Died: February 2, 1954; Zürich, Switzerland
- Occupations: Composer; conductor; pianist
- Years active: 1918 - 1954
- Notable work: Three Romanian Dances, Symphonic Suite (1950), Two Symphonic Sketches (1929)
- Children: 2

Theodor Rogalski (April 11, 1901 - February 2, 1954) was a Romanian composer, conductor and pianist of Polish origin. He played an important role in the development of Romanian musical culture in the first half of the twentieth century.

== Life and career ==
After studying in Bucharest with Alfonso Castaldi and Dimitrie Cuclin, he studied at the Leipzig Conservatory (1920 - 1923) and then at the Schola Cantorum in Paris (1923-1926), where he was a disciple of Vincent d'Indy (composition, conducting) and of Maurice Ravel (orchestration). In 1926, he won First Prize at the "George Enescu" National Composition Competition (established in 1913) with the work String Quartet in F major. He also entered the concert programs of the Philharmonic with Two Romanian Dances for Winds, Piano and Drums (1927) and Two Symphonic Sketches (1929), whose value has determined George Enescu to select it for the concert held at the International Exhibition in New York in 1939.

While continuing to explore the line opened by Burial at the outskirts and Dances for rain-Paparudele-, see Rainmaking (ritual) (both from the Two symphonic sketches) through the new technical approach of capitalizing the folk vein, with emphasis on rhythmic diversity, poly-tonal overlaps and a unique harmonic color, Theodor Rogalski composes, two decades later, in 1950, the symphonic suite Three Romanian Dances, which is a landmark of the Romanian music school of the time.

The two decades, 1930-1950, in which composing remained in the background, were dedicated by the musician to conducting and building an ensemble, from its establishment to the level of a prestigious orchestra, today bearing the name of National Radio Orchestra of Romania. As such, he was the first conductor of the orchestra starting from 1930.

The baton of first conductor was also offered to him at the "George Enescu" Philharmonic (1950-1954). In these last years of his life he also held the position of orchestration teacher at the Bucharest Conservatory.

== List of compositions ==
- 1918

- Sonata for piano (1921 - first mention of the "George Enescu" Composition Prize)

- 1919 - Piano Suite

- (1919 - 2nd mention of the "George Enescu" Composition Prize)

- 1920 -

- Paysage for piano - Pastoral for piano - Berceuse for cello and piano - Piece for cello and piano - Historiette for cello and piano - Minuetto for cello and piano - Parfum exotique for cello and piano - "Pavanne" for cello and piano - Idylle and Tambourin (For the motif "O du lieber Augustin") for string quartet - The song "Le Silence", on lyrics by CH. Batillot - Orchesterstuck (1923 - 2nd prize of the "George Enescu" Composition Prize) - Operetta Nina

- 1921

- Rondo - Sonet for piano - Aubade for piano

- 1922 - Winter for piano

- Romanzetta for piano - Suite for violin and piano: Aubade, Interlude, Sonet (1922 - mention of the "George Enescu" Composition Prize) - Andante from a projected Sonata for cello and piano - Vieille Chanson for two violins and viola - Fruhlingsnacht for 2 violins and cello - Andantino for string quartet - Dance for string quartet - 2 lieds for voice and piano on lyrics by R. Dehmel: Erlengang , Einst im Herbst - 2 lieds for voice and orchestra: lied on lyrics by Heine, untitled, Helle Nacht on lyrics by R. Dehmel

- 1924

- Idylle for piano

- Retrospective Serenade for piano

- 1925

- Ballad on Romanian themes for violin and piano - Bourree for cello and piano - Canon , for violin, cello and piano - String Quartet (1925 - 1st prize of the "George Enescu" Composition Prize) - Four Evocations for the soprano: The Song of the Wise, The Song of the Lover, The Song of the Rain, The Song of the Swing - Two Romanian Dances for winds, piano and percussion (1927 - mention in Venice) - Fresque Antique, ballet music

- 1928

- La Chef (on romanian themes), for string quartet

- 1929

- Two Symphonic Sketches: Burial at the outskirts, Dances for rain-Paparudele- (Rainmaking ritual)

- Stage music for the "Don Juan" play by Victor Eftimiu

- 1930

- Three pieces for cello

- 1931

- Suite for oboe and piano

- 1932

- Two Capriccios for Orchestra

- 1933

- Three songs on folk lyrics for soprano and orchestra: Hora Ciciului, Willow, The Lazar

- 1940

- Three Romanian Ballads for tenor and orchestra: Iancu Jianu, Mihu the Child, Toma Alimoș

- 1941

- Festive March for Orchestra

- 1949

- 3 Pieces of Mechanical Music for Orchestra

- 1950

- Symphonic suite Three Romanian dances

- 1951

- Soundtrack for the film Life Triumphs
