= Thalia Sabanieva =

Greek soprano (1889–1963)

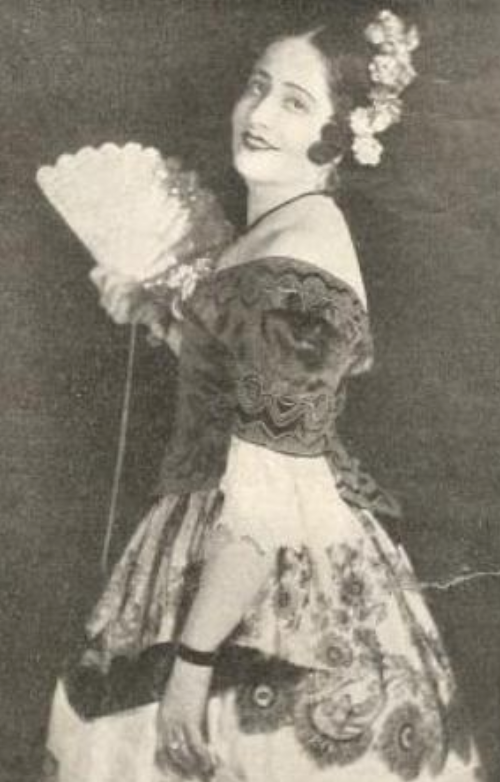
- Thalia Sabanieva as Rosina in The Barber of Seville, from a 1923 publication
- Born: 23 December 1889; Greece
- Died: 20 March 1963 (aged 73); New York
- Other name: Thalia Samossoud
- Occupation: Opera Singer
- Years active: 1920s, 1930s
- Spouse: Jacques Alexandria Samossoud

Thalia Sabanieva (23 December 1889 – 20 March 1963), also seen as Thalia Sabanieeva, was a Greek soprano.

== Early life ==
Thalia Sabanieva was born in Athens in 1889. She was proud of her Greek birth, and spoke Greek, but objected to being called a "Greek singer", because she was educated in Russia. "What I am as a singer I owe entirely to Russia", she declared in 1937. She studied music with Vera Cehanovska, mother of Russian baritone George Cehanovsky.

== Career ==
Sabanieva sang with the Metropolitan Opera in New York from 1923 to 1930. She sang with the San Francisco Opera in the 1924–1925 season, appearing in L'Amico Fritz, Madama Butterfly, and Manon. In 1928 she made several recordings for the Victor Talking Machine Company. In 1933, she sang in the American premiere of Tchaikovsky's Mazeppa. She was a member of Max Panteleieff's New York-based Russian Opera Company in the mid-1930s.

Sabanieva was often on the programs of charity benefit concerts and special events. In 1933, she sang a duet with Mario Chamlee at a gala marking the 25th anniversary of Giulio Gatti-Casazza's directorship at the Metropolitan Opera. In 1935, she sang at a benefit concert for Jewish artisans in Poland, with cellist Mila Wellerson, at New York's Town Hall venue, and at another benefit performance with Lucrezia Bori and Tito Schipa, for the WIlloughby House Settlement in Brooklyn. In 1937 she sang at a benefit concert at Carnegie Hall alongside Elisabeth Rethberg, Josephine Antoine, and other singers, raising funds for Chrystie Street House, a shelter for homeless men.

Sabanieva had two film credits, for a supporting role in a Greek film, That's Life (1935), and in the title role in a film adaptation of Natalka Poltavka (1937), though she was an unlikely choice to play a young heroine by then. She was featured in a Life magazine photograph, when her dog appeared on the magazine's cover in 1944. Sabanieva taught voice students later in life.

== Personal life ==
Sabanieva was briefly married Russian conductor Jacques Alexandria Samossoud from 1927 to 1929; he later married Clara Clemens in 1944. Thalia Sabanieva died in 1963, in New York.
