= Party of the Roma =

Party of the Roma Partida Romilor „Pro Europa” Partida le Romenge
- President: Nicolae Păun
- Chamber leader: Nicolae Păun
- Founded: 19 March 1990
- Registered: 3 April 1990
- Headquarters: Str. Telița Nr. 31, Sector 5, Bucharest
- Ideology: Romani nationalism Romani minority interests Social democracy
- Political position: Centre
- National affiliation: National Minorities Parliamentary Group
- Colours: Black
- Chamber of Deputies: 1 / 330
- Senate: 0 / 136
- European Parliament: 0 / 33

Website
- www.partidaromilor.ro

The Party of the Roma (Romanian: Partida Romilor „Pro Europa”, PRPE; Vlax Romani: Partida le Romenge), known until 2008 as Social Democratic Party of the Roma (Romanian: Partida Romilor Social-Democrată, PRS-D), is a political party in Romania representing the Romani minority. Its leader is Nicolae Păun, and it currently has one reserved seat in the Chamber of Deputies.

== Parliamentary representation ==
Founded in 1990, after the Romanian Revolution, the Party of the Roma is the official political association of the Romani minority in Romania and consequently has one reserved seat in the Chamber of Deputies, regardless of its electoral performance. The party has contested every election since the 1992 suffrage, but has never passed the 5% threshold required for it to gain extra seats.

At the 2000, 2004, and 2012 legislative elections, the Party of the Roma signed a protocol of reciprocal electoral support with the Social Democratic Party (PSD).

The reserved seat has been held by Gheorghe Răducanu between 1992 and 1996, by Mădălin Voicu between 1996 and 2000, and by Nicolae Păun between 2000 and 2004 and since 2004 onwards.

== Local representation ==
At the 2016 Romanian local elections, 143 municipal councillors and one mayor, Dumitru Mircea in Brăhășești, were elected on behalf of the PRPE.

== Electoral history ==
=== Legislative elections ===
Election	Chamber of Deputies			Senate		
Election	Votes	%	Seats	Votes	%	Seats
1992	52,704	0.48	1			
1996	82,195	0.67	1	–	–	–
2000	71,786	0.63	1	–	–	–
2004	56,076	0.55	1	–	–	–
2008	44,037	0.61	1	–	–	–
2012	22,124	0.30	1	–	–	–
2016	13,126	0.19	1	–	–	–

=== European elections ===
Election	Votes	Percentage	MEPs	Position	EU Party	EP Group
2007	58,903	1.14%	0 / 35	12th	—	—
2009	did not compete				—	—
2014	did not compete				—	—
2019	did not compete				—	—
