= Mădălin Voicu =

Romanian musician and politician

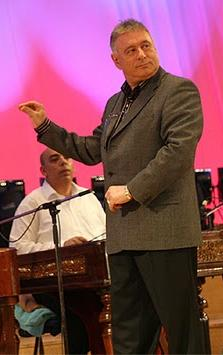

Member of the Chamber of Deputies
- Incumbent
- Assumed office 3 November 1996

Personal details
- Born: Mădălin Ştefan Voicu; 1952 (age 73–74) Bucharest, Romania
- Party: Social Democratic Party
- Other political affiliations: PRS-D; PLUS
- Parent: Ion Voicu (father)
- Education: National University of Music Bucharest

Mădălin Voicu (born 1952) is a Romanian Romani musician and politician. Voicu is a member of the Social Democratic Party (PSD) and has been a parliamentarian in the Chamber of Deputies since 1996. He is one of only two ethnic Romani politicians in the current parliament; the other is Nicolae Păun, who holds the seat specifically reserved for a member of the Romani minority.

Voicu, born in 1952 in Bucharest, is the son of Ion Voicu, a well-known Romani-Romanian musician. In his youth, he was close friends with Nicu Ceaușescu, the son of Communist Romania's leader Nicolae Ceaușescu, as well as with other young members of the nomenklatura.

Voicu graduated from the National University of Music, completed training as a conductor at various schools abroad, and was employed by orchestras in Craiova and Ploiești.

He began his political activity in 1994-1996 as a member of the defunct Party of Liberty and Social Unity (Romanian: Partidul Libertății și Unității Sociale, PLUS) and then became active in the Social Democratic Roma Party of Romania (PRS-D). Voicu was elected to the seat reserved for minorities in the 1996-2000 legislature before running on the common PRS-D-PSD list in 2000.
