= Ograda =

- Commune
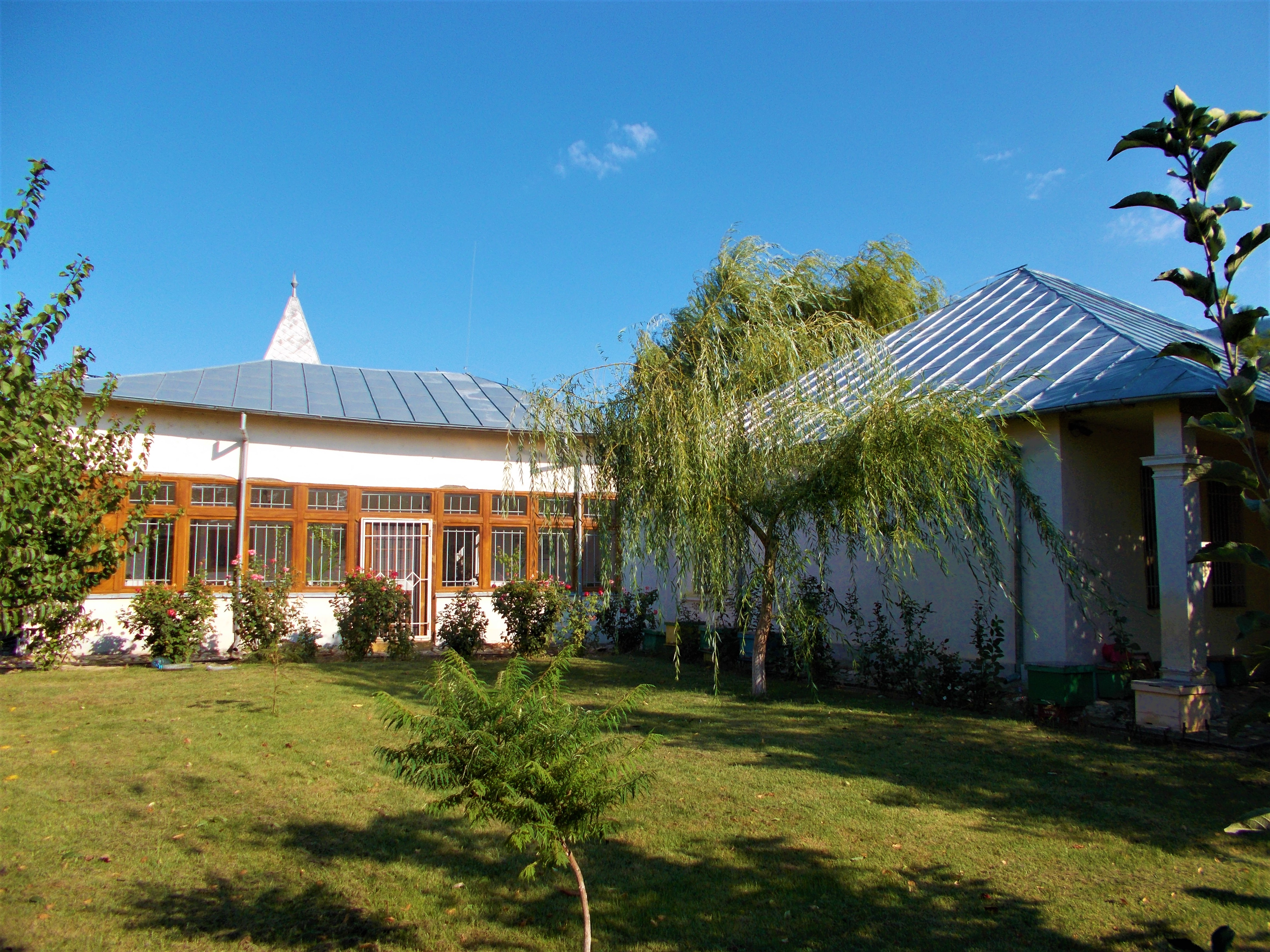
- Ionel Perlea memorial house

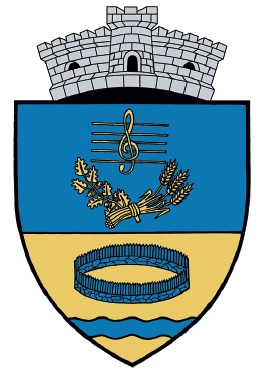
- Coat of arms

- Location in Ialomița County

- Location in Romania
- Coordinates: 44°37′N 27°35′E
- Country: Romania
- County: Ialomița

Government
  - Mayor (2024–2028): Lilian Badea (PSD)
- Area: 62.61 km^{2} (24.17 sq mi)
- Elevation: 22 m (72 ft)
- Population (2021-12-01): 2,763
  - Density: 44.13/km^{2} (114.3/sq mi)
- Time zone: UTC+02:00 (EET)
  - Summer (DST): UTC+03:00 (EEST)
- Postal code: 927061
- Area code: +(40) 243
- Vehicle reg.: IL
- Website: www.primariaograda.ro

Ograda is a commune located in Ialomița County, Muntenia, Romania. It is composed of a single village, Ograda.

The commune lies on the Wallachian Plain, on the left bank of the Ialomița River. Located 18 km (11 mi) east of the county seat, Slobozia, it is crossed by national road DN2A.

Historical population
Year	Pop.	±%
1899	945	—
1925	1,501	+58.8%
2002	2,869	+91.1%
2011	2,803	−2.3%
2021	2,763	−1.4%
Source: Census data

== Natives ==
- Jonel Perlea (1900–1970), conductor
