= Constantin Silvestri =

Romanian conductor and composer

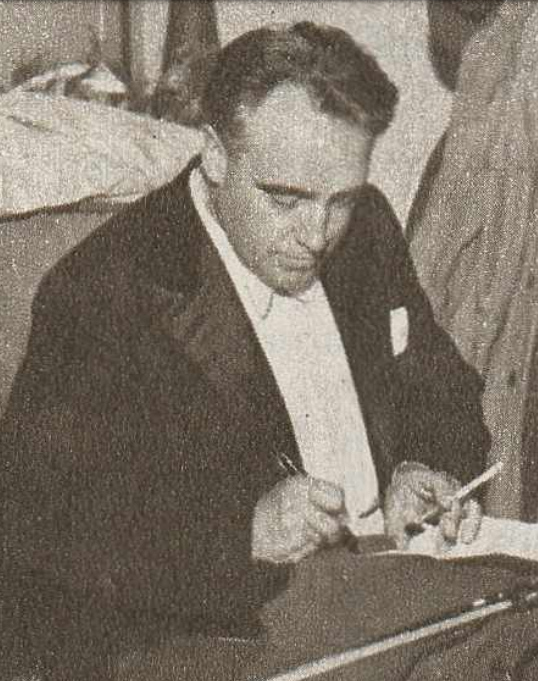
Image of Constantin Silvestri

Constantin-Nicolae Silvestri (Romanian: [konstanˈtin silˈvestri]; 31 May 1913, Bucharest – 23 February 1969, London) was a Romanian conductor and composer.

== Early life ==
Silvestri, born of Austro-Italian-Romanian stock, was brought up mostly by his mother, his father dying from alcoholism, and his stepfather dying when the boy was 16. He had learnt how to play the piano and organ before the age of six. He played the piano in public at 10 and was a skilled improviser. He studied at the Târgu Mureş Conservatoire, and later at the Bucharest Conservatoire. His teachers in Bucharest included Mihail Jora (composition) and Florica Musicescu (piano). Despite not having taken conducting classes, he was already appearing as conductor in his teens, making his debut in 1930 with the Bucharest Radio Symphony Orchestra in a concert which included The Rite of Spring and his own composition Prelude and Fugue (Toccata).

== Career ==
Silvestri's success in this 1930 National Radio Orchestra of Romania concert persuaded him to follow conducting as a career. He conducted at the Romanian National Opera from 1935 on, and, following the brief tenures of two caretakers, he also directed the Bucharest Philharmonic Orchestra for six years as successor to George Georgescu, in disgrace as a Nazi collaborator. Georgescu assumed directorship of the Radio Orchestra; following Silvestri's emigration to the West, Georgescu would resume his place at the head of the Philharmonic, shortly thereafter renamed the George Enescu Philharmonic. From 1948 to 1956, Silvestri taught at the Bucharest Conservatoire (Conservatorul din București), where he founded its Conducting Department. Among Silvestri's students were Sergiu Comissiona, Marius Constant, Anatol Vieru, Iosif Conta, Edgar Cosma. By the 1950s Silvestri was accepting guest engagements in the USSR, Czechoslovakia and Hungary. His career in Romania came to a climax in 1958 with the highly successful Romanian premiere of Oedipe in Bucharest.

After leaving his home country Silvestri made Paris his domicile in 1959, also travelling to Australia that year, and appearing with the Chicago Symphony Orchestra and Philadelphia Orchestra in 1960–61, and making a number of recordings in Paris, London and Vienna for EMI.

Having made his UK début with the London Philharmonic Orchestra in 1957 at the Royal Albert Hall, Silvestri defected to Great Britain in 1961 and assumed the post of Principal Conductor of the Bournemouth Symphony Orchestra. He raised the standard and prestige of the orchestra to one of international standing. He was demanding and meticulous in rehearsal, his scores marked in different colours; however, his performances often differed from one concert to the next.

Silvestri made his debut at the Royal Opera House Covent Garden with Khovanshchina in the Shostakovich version (in an English translation by Edward Downes) in June 1963.

He became a British citizen in 1967 shortly before his growing reputation was cut short by increasing ill health, and he died of cancer at the age of 55. His last concert was in Exeter on 29 November 1968, and he is buried at St Peter's Church in Bournemouth.

Biographies are available on Silvestri, by Eugen Pricope, John Gritten and Ioana Raluca Voicu-Arnăuţoiu. King's College London holds a substantial documentary archive of his life and work.

== Recording ==
In Romania and Eastern Europe, before moving to the West, Silvestri made around 20 LPs, often of repertoire he did not subsequently re-record.

Recordings for which he is particularly well known include Edward Elgar's Overture In the South (Alassio), and Tchaikovsky's 5th symphony. His recordings received a First Prize from the Académie Charles Cros (for Antonín Dvořák's Symphony No.9, "From the New World") and the Grand Prix du Disque (for George Enescu's Dixtuor for Winds).

Silvestri conducted and recorded with many of the world's leading orchestras, such as the Berlin Philharmonic, Philharmonia, Concertgebouw, Paris Conservatoire Orchestra, Suisse Romande, Vienna Philharmonic Orchestra.

In addition to commercial recordings, the BBC Legends label has issued six CDs of radio performances from the 1960s with Silvestri conducting the Bournemouth orchestra. In 2013, EMI re-issued most of his recordings with that company in a 15-disc set in which one reviewer noted the performances' "consistent character and quality"; alongside Tchaikovsky's symphonies 4-6 and Manfred, there was much other Russian music, Dvořák symphonies 7-9, and works by Bartok, Hindemith, Berlioz, Franck, Ravel and Debussy.

Video and audio rarities with excerpts from Silvestri's concerts, rehearsals, live and studio recordings are featured in Anda Anastasescu Gritten's film series 'CONSTANTIN SILVESTRI: Avant-gardist, Master improviser, Homme passionné' (7 episodes: Prelude, Lead soldiers, The little shepherd, Fireworks, Pictures at an exhibition, Nocturne, Bacchanalia). In the films, Silvestri conducts the Bournemouth Symphony Orchestra, the ORTF Orchestra, the Bucharest Philharmonic, the Romanian National Radio Symphony Orchestra and the orchestra of the Romanian National Opera.

On the occasion of the 40th anniversary of Silvestri’s death and after 19 years of campaigning to revive his memory, pianist Anda Anastasescu and journalist John Gritten produced a 2-CD set for the RMA label (Romanian Musical Adventure) with Silvestri conducting the Bournemouth orchestra. The album has an unusual history: many of the concerts conducted by Silvestri in Britain were broadcast by the BBC. Lack of archive space led to the destruction of the master tapes of the majority of these broadcasts but Silvestri had recorded many concerts and 350 reel-to-reel tapes were given to the Bournemouth Symphony Orchestra archive by his widow. A chance re-discovery of the tapes by the orchestra’s librarian led to the involvement of Raymond Carpenter, the orchestra’s principal clarinettist during his leadership and the BSO’s and Silvestri’s archivist. The set contains works broadcast by the BBC in the 1960s from Bournemouth and Bristol: Silvestri's own 'Three Pieces for Strings', Enescu's Symphony No. 1, First and Second Orchestral Suites, Mozart's Magic Flute Overture, Prokofiev's Symphony No. 1 and Dvorak's Slavonic Dances.

== Compositions ==
Silvestri also composed over 40 orchestral, chamber and vocal works. These include Prelude and Fugue (Toccata), Sonata quasi una fantasia, Op 19, No 2 (1940), Chants Nostalgiques, Op 27, No 1 (1944), String Quartet, Op 27, No 2 (1944), Sonata for solo harp, Three Pieces for Strings, Op 4, No 2 (1933), and Romanian Dances from Transylvania, Op 4, No 1 (1930).

The UK premières of the following works were given by pianist Anda Anastasescu in the Wigmore Hall, London; Piano Suite 'Children's Games' No. 2 (Op. 3 No. 2) on 14 July 2003, Sonata Op. 28 No. 1 'Rapsodia in 3 episodi' on 28 December 2004 and Sonata Op. 19 No. 2 'Quasi una fantasia' and 'Chants nostalgiques' Op. 27 No. 1 on 30 December 2005. The UK Première of Piano Suite 'Children Games' No. 1 (Op. 3 No. 1) was given by Anda Anastasescu in the Purcell Room, London, on 15 December 1999 as part of the series 'Bridging the Millenia with Four Anniversaries. Hommage to Silvestri, Shostakovich, Copland and Turina' 1999–2000.

The UK Première of the Sonata for Clarinet and Piano Op. 19 No. 1 was given by Raymond Carpenter (Bournemouth Symphony Orchestra Principal Clarinet) and Anda Anastasescu in the Purcell Room, South Bank Centre London, 15 December 1999. The UK Première of the 'Romanian dances from Transylvania' Op.4 No.1 (Bihor Dances) for piano 4 hands, was given by pianists Anda Anastasescu and Alberto Portugheis in Kings Place, London, on 4 July 2010.

The Piano Suites Nos. 1, 2, 3 are featured in Anastasescu's film series 'CONSTANTIN SILVESTRI: Avant-gardist, Master improviser, Homme passionné' (7 episodes: Prelude, Lead soldiers, The little shepherd, Fireworks, Pictures at an exhibition, Nocturne, Bacchanalia), dedicated to the 2021 George Enescu International Festival, Bucharest. Anastasescu recorded the three piano suites for the 'Patrimoniu' archives of the Romanian National Radio in November/December 2019.

On 19 March 2005, The London Schubert Players Chamber Orchestra, conducted by Hu Kun, gave the public UK Première of the 'Three pieces for strings' in the 'Classicalive Festival' in the Olympia Exhibition Centre, London. A second London performance took place in the Romanian Cultural Institute on 15 November 2005 as part of Anastasescu's festival 'A Romanian Musical Adventure' 2005-2006, the first-ever British festival of Romanian composers. The work had been previously performed on 29 April 2004 in the Romanian Embassy in London by the 'George Enescu Youth Orchestra' (the orchestra of the George Enescu Music School in Bucharest) conducted by Bogdan Voda. The concert was part of a concert tour in the UK, organised by Anda Anastasescu who is an alumna.

The first commercially released CD with the ‘Three Pieces for Strings’ (‘A World of Music with the London Schubert Players’) produced by Cressidia Classics in the UK in 1996 was recorded in 1990 in Bucharest’s Athenaeum concert hall by the Romanian record company ‘Electrecord’.

== Bibliography ==
- Gritten, John. (1998). A Musician Before His Time. Constantin Silvestri – Conductor, Composer, Pianist with a Foreword by Yehudi Menuhin (Lord Menuhin of Stoke D'Abernon), 70 illustrations, 304 pp. ISBN 1-900496-12-7 (Kitzinger, London)

Preceded by George Georgescu	Principal Conductor, Bucharest Philharmonic Orchestra; 1945–1953	Succeeded by George Georgescu
Preceded by Emanoil Ciomac	Director, Bucharest Philharmonic Orchestra; 1947–1953	Succeeded by George Georgescu
Preceded by Ionel Perlea	Principal Conductor, Romanian National Radio Symphony Orchestra; 1953–1958	Succeeded by Iosif Conta
Preceded by -	Artistic Director, Romanian National Opera; 1953–1957	Succeeded by Constantin Bugeanu
Preceded by	Founder of the Conducting Department, Bucharest Conservatoire; 1948–1958	Succeeded by
Preceded by Charles Groves	Principal Conductor, Bournemouth Symphony Orchestra; 1961–1969	Succeeded by Paavo Berglund
