= Valentin Gheorghiu =

Romanian classical pianist and composer (1928–2023)

- Born: 21 March 1928; Galați, Kingdom of Romania
- Died: 17 July 2023 (aged 95); Bucharest, Romania
- Resting place: Bellu Cemetery, Bucharest
- Education: Bucharest Academy of Music; Conservatoire de Paris
- Occupations: Pianist; Composer
- Organizations: Romanian Trio
- Relatives: Ștefan Gheorghiu (brother)
- Awards: George Enescu Prize; National Order of Faithful Service, Grand Cross class; Order of Cultural Merit, 1st class; Aristizza Romanescu Prize

Valentin Gheorghiu (Romanian pronunciation: [valenˈtin ɡe̯orˈɡi.u]; 21 March 1928 – 17 July 2023) was a Romanian classical pianist and composer. He is regarded as a leading Romanian pianist of the twentieth century, focused on both piano concertos of the Romantic period and chamber music. He won the prize for the best performance of Enescu's Violin Sonata No. 3 at the first George Enescu International Competition in 1958, with his brother Ștefan as the violinist. He made recordings with international orchestras and conductors.

== Life and career ==
Gheorghiu, born in Galați, Kingdom of Romania, on 21 March 1928, began to play the piano at age four. He studied first, from age seven, at the Bucharest Academy of Music, piano with Constanța Erbiceanu, theory, solfeggio, harmony, counterpoint and composition with Mihail Jora, and chamber music with Mihail Andricu. At age nine, George Enescu recommended him to the Ministry of Culture as a "rare talent, who should be carefully nurtured". He received a scholarship to study further at the Conservatoire de Paris from 1937 to 1939, piano with Lazare Lévy, theory and solfeggio with Marcelle Meyer, and harmony with Noël Gallon. He made his debut with orchestra at age 15 with the Bucharest Philharmonic conducted by George Georgescu, playing Beethoven's Piano Concerto No. 1.

Gheorghiu was a member of the Romanian Trio, together with his brother Ștefan Gheorghiu as the violinist and Radu Aldulescu. He and his brother won the prize for the best performance of Enescu's Violin Sonata No. 3 at the first George Enescu International Competition in 1958.

Gheorgiu was first only allowed to play in Eastern European countries, but after 1957 also performed in Europe, North America, Israel, and Japan, with orchestras including the Gewandhausorchester, the Staatskapelle Dresden, the Bavarian Radio Symphony Orchestra, and the Orchestre de Paris, with conductors including Rafael Kubelik, Kurt Masur, Seiji Ozawa, and Simon Rattle. He played Schumann's Piano Concerto at the 1963 Salzburg Festival, conducted by Georgescu. Gheorghiu has served on the juries of more than 60 international competitions.

Gheorghiu was a member of the jury of more than 60 international competitions, including the Paloma O'Shea International Piano Competition in Santander, and the Queen Elisabeth Competition. In 2014, he was elected corresponding member of the Romanian Academy.

Gheorghiu died in Bucharest on 17 July 2023, at age 95, and was buried in the city's Bellu Cemetery.

== Repertoire ==
As a pianist, Gheorghiu focused on Romantic music by composers such as Schubert, Brahms, Grieg, Chopin, Liszt, and Rachmaninoff. His wide repertoire included also music by Beethoven, as well as contemporary works by Romanian composers, such as George Enescu, Paul Constantinescu, and his own.

== Recordings ==
Gheorghiu recorded piano concertos over decades with international orchestras and conductors. His recording of Mendelssohns two piano concertos, with Herbert Kegel conducting the Leipzig Radio Orchestra, was reviewed favourably in 1983 by Stephen Plaistow from Gramophone, compared to recordings with András Schiff and Murray Perahia. His playing is described as of a "weightier kind of brilliance", "direct and unaffected", and the recording with an "invigorating" sweep. He recorded works for violin and piano by Enescu with Sherban Lupu, and a reviewer from Gramophone wrote that he "proves himself an ideal collaborator. His subtle negotiation of colour, dynamics and rhythm mirror Lupu's controlled rhapsodising to perfection".

His recordings include:

- 1950s – Rachmaninov: Rhapsody on a Theme of Paganini, Liszt: Piano Concerto No. 1, with the Czech Philharmonic Orchestra conducted by George Georgescu, Supraphon, reissued in 2000
- 1960 – Chopin: Favourite Works for Solo Piano, UK HMV XLP 20021
- 1985 – Schumann: Piano Concerto, with the Cluj-Napoca Philharmonic conducted by Emil Simon
- 1985 – Beethoven: Piano Concerto No. 4, Choral Fantasy, with the Cluj-Napoca Philharmonic conducted by Simon
- 1987 – Beethoven: Piano Concerto No. 5, with the Cluj-Napoca Philharmonic conducted by Simon
- 1987 – Grieg: Piano Concerto, with the Cluj-Napoca Philharmonic conducted by Cristian Mandeal
- 1987 – Brahms: Piano Concerto No. 1, with the Cluj-Napoca Philharmonic conducted by Mandeal
- 1991 – Constantinescu: Piano Concerto, with the Cluj-Napoca Philharmonic conducted by Simon

== Compositions ==
Gheorghiu's compositions include a piano Sonata, which was awarded the Romanian Academy's Georges Enesco Prize, a Burlesque for piano and violin, a piano trio, a cello sonata, a string quartet, Chorale and Fugue for organ and orchestra, and songs:

- String Quartet, 1946
- Piano Sonata, 1946
- Symphony No. 1, 1949
- Cello Sonata, 1950
- Piano Trio, 1950
- Symphony No. 2, 1953, 1974
- Piano Concerto, 1959
- Imagini din copilarie, suite for orchestra, 1961
- Burlesque for piano and orchestra, 1964
- Chorale and Fugue for organ and orchestra

== Awards ==
Gheorgiu was awarded an honorary doctorate from the National University of Music Bucharest. He received the Enescu Prize for his compositions, the Aristizza Romanescu Prize of the Romanian Academy for lifetime achievements (1993), and the Award for Excellence in Romanian Culture. He was also awarded the Order of Cultural Merit, 1st class, the National Order of Faithful Service, Grand Cross class (2000), and the Nihil Sine Deo decoration from the Romanian royal family. On the occasion of his 93rd birthday, the National Orchestra played a concert in his honour.
