= Eugen Pricope =

Romanian conductor, music critic and writer

Eugen Pricope (Oituz, 16 April 1927 - Onesti, 3 May 1992) was a Romanian conductor, music critic, and writer.

He wrote such books as "Silvestri" (about the conductor, Constantin Silvestri, "Conductors and Orchestras", "Ghid de Concert" (which offers a thorough explanation of the greatest classical composers), "Intre straluciri si... cantace de pustiu", "The Symphony until Beethoven", and "Beethoven" (monography). Eugen Pricope wrote many articles for the Romanian media, as well.

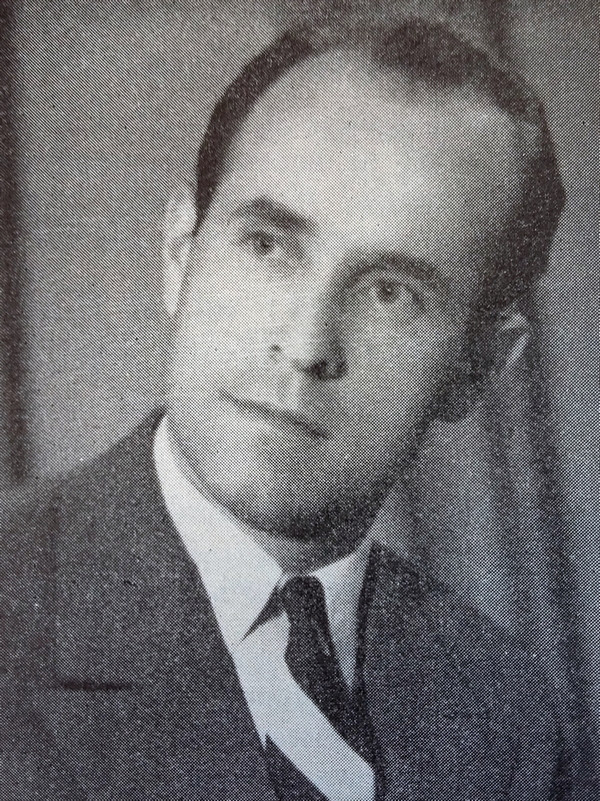
Pricope in 1970

Pricope was frequently invited on Romanian Radio for Iosif Sava's "Invitații Euterpei" ("The Guests of Euterpe") in the 1990s, commenting on aesthetics, music history and performance, etc.
