= Washington National Opera (1919–1936) =

The Washington National Opera Association, founded in 1919 as Washington Community Opera, was a low-budget opera company, comprising professional principals supported by amateurs, active in Washington, D.C., until 1936.

It was in no way related to the company of the same name. By 1921 it had changed its name to the "Washington National Opera Association".

== History ==
Its founder and moving force was a minor baritone who was born in Canada as Thomas Harold Meek but who adopted the name Edouard Albion upon settling in Washington and establishing a voice studio. Meek recruited soprano Enrica Clay Dillon to serve as the company's first Artistic Director, a role she held from 1919-1927.

The company offered a wide range of works during its first year, beginning with a January 13, 1919, performance of Gilbert and Sullivan's The Pirates of Penzance and continuing, at intervals throughout the next several months, with Michael William Balfe's The Bohemian Girl; Georges Bizet's Carmen; Ruggero Leoncavallo's Pagliacci; and Charles Gounod's Faust, which marked the conductorial debut with the company of Arnold Volpe. The first production to feature significant professional singers was a Carmen in February 1920 with two European veterans, Belgian soprano Marguerita Sylva and Czech tenor Otakar Marák. Other important singers who would appear with the company in succeeding years included Mabel Garrison, Jeanne Gordon, Louise Homer, Edith Mason, Pasquale Amato, George Baklanov, Edward Johnson, Giuseppi Danise, and Titta Ruffo.

In the course of its more than 90 performances, the company was responsible for several accomplishments all out of proportion with its modest status. In 1925, it trumped the Chicago Opera in court to offer Feodor Chaliapin's first Washington operatic performance, and it also featured the operatic debut of John Charles Thomas. This took place in the new National Opera House located at 19th and E Streets.

A year later, it would present the first performances of Tchaikovsky's Queen of Spades in Russian by an established US opera company. These were also the first performances by such a company in any language since the work's American premiere at the Metropolitan Opera in German some 16 years before. In the Washington production, Dmitri Smirnov gave what were probably his sole American performances after his departure from the Metropolitan in 1912.

Later that year, Romanian conductor George Georgescu stepped in for Jacques Samossoud, who had left the company over a contract dispute, to make his sole appearance in a US opera pit. At the time, Georgescu was more celebrated for having recently taken over the remainder of the Philharmonic Symphony Orchestra of New York's season from an ailing Arturo Toscanini.

Also, in a 1928 Die Walküre, Johanna Gadski performed in an American opera production for the first time since her departure from the Metropolitan more than a decade earlier owing to anti-German sentiment during World War I. The Washington company in the same year presented the American premiere of Ralph Vaughan Williams's Hugh the Drover under Eugene Goossens with Tudor Davies, creator of the role of Hugh. The company's penultimate performance, a 1936 production of Léo Delibes's Lakmé, marked the US debut of Bidu Sayão, although after a fractious dispute with the orchestra players, the performance was accompanied by a portable organ.

With the coming of the Depression and the limitations of the National Opera House, the company used it fairly infrequently, and it dissolved during the period. Limited opera was performed in Washington until the 1950s, except open-air summer performances beside the Potomac River or in Rock Creek Park's Carter Barron Amphitheatre. Performances in the latter venue lasted for twenty seasons, and included, on 8 July 1965, one by the young tenor Plácido Domingo, partnered by mezzo-soprano Rosalind Elias, in Carmen.
