= Hugo Reichenberger =

German conductor and composer

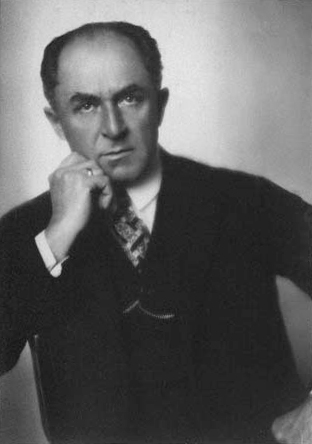
Hugo Reichenberger

Hugo Reichenberger (28 July 1873 – 11 October 1938) was a German conductor and composer.

After stations in Bremen, Aachen, Stuttgart and Munich (National Theatre) Hugo Reichenberger became 1st "Kapellmeister" at the Stadttheater Frankfurt/Main in 1905 where he premiered Richard Strauss' Salome in 1907. From 1908 to 1935 he was a permanent conductor at the Vienna Court Opera and State Opera. He was one of the most frequent conductors of the Vienna State Opera, giving more than 2000 performances, among which emerge the premieres of Richard Strauss' Elektra in 1909 and Leos Janáceks Jenufa in 1918.

As a guest conductor he visited Madrid, Berlin (Philharmonic Orchestra), Coburg, Bukarest, Munich, Warsaw, Budapest, Amsterdam, Antwerp, Brussels and Egypt.

== Bibliography ==
- Gustav Mahler Briefe 1879–1911, hg. von Alma Maria Mahler (Berlin 1924)
- Riemann 1929, 1959
- Marcell Klang Die geistige Elite Österreichs (Wien 1936) S. 739–741
- Deutsches Theaterlexikon 1992
- Teresa Hrdlicka, ''Sie werden Freude erleben. Zur Korrespondenz Janácek - Reichenberger'', in: Programmheft der Wiener Staatsoper, Saison 2001/2002, Leos Janácek: Jenufa S. 52–71.
- Teresa Hrdlicka, "....das Möglichste an Sangbarkeit und Sprachgewandtheit. Neue Erkenntnisse zur Entstehung der deutschen Übersetzung von Leos Janáceks Oper “Jenufa” von 1918", in Österreichische Musikzeitschrift, 58. Jg., 2/2003
- Richard Strauss – Hugo Reichenberger: Briefwechsel, hg. von Teresa Hrdlicka, in Richard Strauss-Blätter, Heft 52, Tutzing 2004
- Georg Günther Carmen - letzter Akt. Die Künstlertragödie Sutter – Obrist von 1910 und die Stuttgarter Oper um 1900. Begleitband und Katalog zur Ausstellung des Staatsarchivs Ludwigsburg und des Stadtarchivs Stuttgart (Ludwigsburg 2003)
- Höslinger, Clemens: "Die erste Aufführung von Janáčeks „Jenufa“ an der Wiener Hofoper (1918) und ihre Vorgeschichte". In Michael Jahn (Hg.): Von Martha bis Daphne. Schriften zur Wiener Operngeschichte 1, (Wien 2005) S. 215-232
