= Radu Aldulescu (musician) =

Romanian musician and music educator

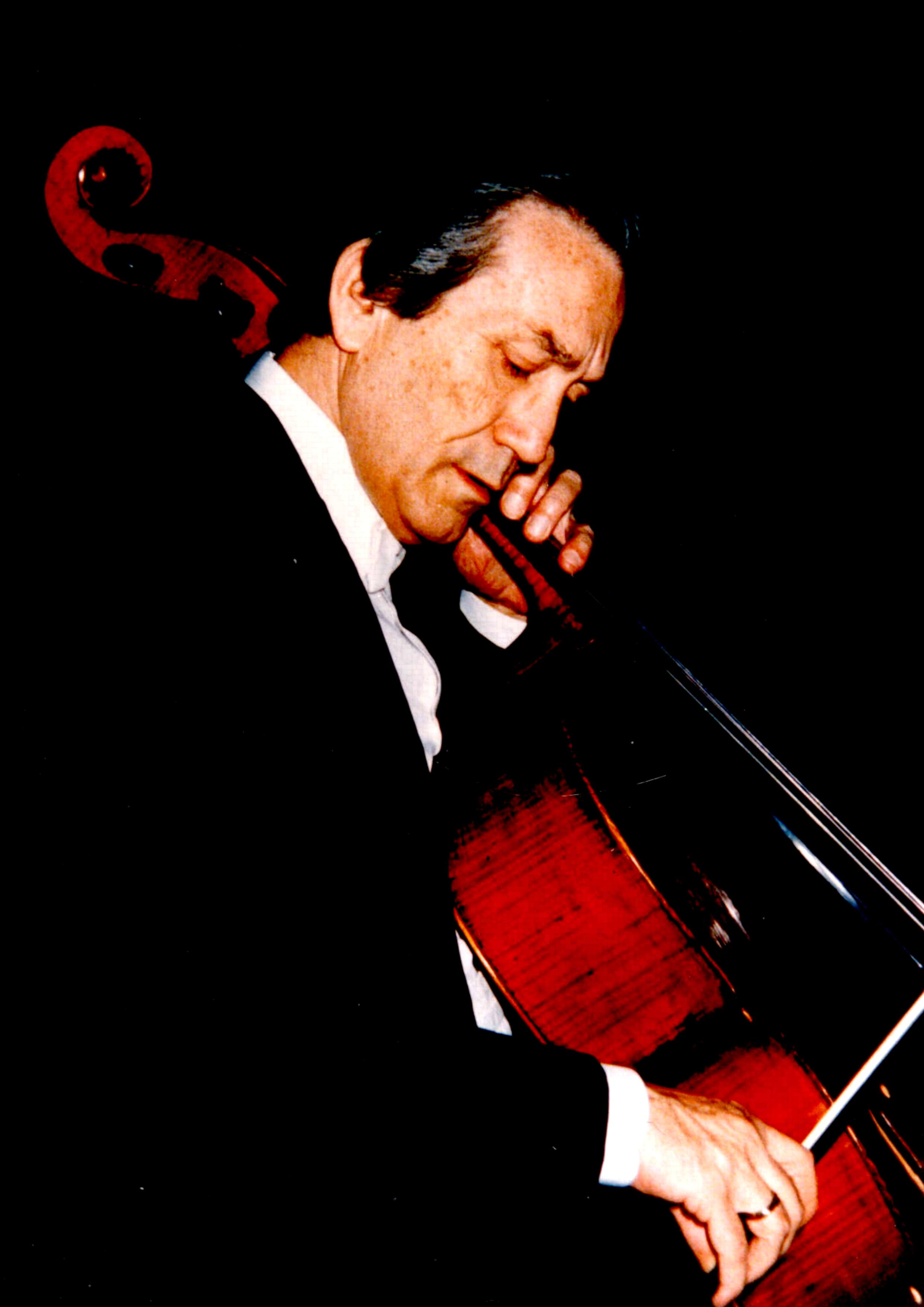
Radu Aldulescu

Radu Aldulescu (17 September 1922 – 19 March 2006) was a Romanian-born Italian cellist.

Aldulescu was born in Piteasca, Ilfov County, and started to study the cello at the age of six with his grandfather Dimitrie Dinicu. When he was twelve, he entered the Royal Academy of Music and Dramatic Art in Bucharest, graduating after five years.

He made his musical debut in 1941 with the National Radio Orchestra of Romania. Between 1950 and 1964 he was a soloist with the Bucharest Philharmonic Orchestra. Together with violinist Ștefan Gheorghiu and pianist Valentin Gheorghiu he formed a trio.

One of his teachers was Gaspar Cassadó.

In 1969, Aldulescu left Romania, settling down in Italy, where he founded, in 1972, the "Trio d’Archi di Roma" together with violinist Salvatore Accardo and violist Luigi Alberto Bianchi. He completed a well received tour of Southern Africa with them, and followed this with three acclaimed tours as a soloist.

He had teaching assignments at the Music Academy in Rome, the Conservatoire de Paris, the City of Basel Music Academy, the Maastricht Conservatoire and the Pescara Music Academy. His students included Paulo Gaio Lima, Ulf Tischbirck, Gemma Serpenti, Mariet van Dijk, Șerban Nichifor, Mirel Iancovici, Marin Cazacu, Eduardo Vassallo, Luigi Piovano, Oliver Parr and Claudia Weertman and Caecilia van Hoof

He died in Nice, France, on 19 March 2006.

== Awards and honors ==
- Harriet Cohen Award, 1967
- At the music festival in Magliano Sabina there is a "Radu Aldulescu" prize in his honor.

== Bibliography ==
- Obituary in România Culturală
- Obituary at Newspad.ro
- Photos from three acclaimed Southern Africa tours
- Biography at internationales literaturfestival berlin
