= Jacques Alexandria Samossoud =

Russian composer and conductor (1894–1966)

Jacques Alexandria Samossoud (September 8, 1894 – June 14, 1966) was a Russian composer and conductor.

== Biography ==
He was born on September 8, 1894. In 1924 he married the Crimean-born Greek soprano Thalia Sabanieva; they divorced in 1926. He conducted the orchestra of the Washington National Opera from 1919 to 1936. He left during a contract dispute.

He married Mark Twain's daughter, Clara Langdon Clemens (1874–1962) in 1944 at Clara's Hollywood, California home.

He died on June 14, 1966.
