= Nicolae Păun (politician) =

Romanian Romani politician

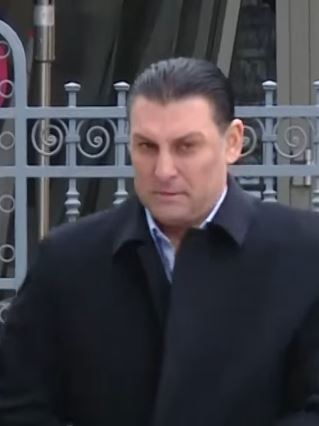
- Păun in 2016

Member of the Chamber of Deputies
- Incumbent
- Assumed office 26 November 2000

Personal details
- Born: 9 November 1964 (age 61)
- Party: Party of the Roma

Nicolae Păun (born 9 November 1964) is a Romanian Romani politician. He is the president of the Party of the Roma, and has held the one reserved seat for Romani people in the Romanian Chamber of Deputies since 2000. Since 2000, he has also been the president of the Committee for Human Rights, Religious Affairs and National Minorities in the Chamber of Deputies.

Nicolae Păun is one of only two ethnic Romani members of parliament in Romania, the other one being Mădălin Voicu of the Social Democratic Party.
