= National Radio Orchestra of Romania =

Romanian Radio National Orchestra
- Radio orchestra
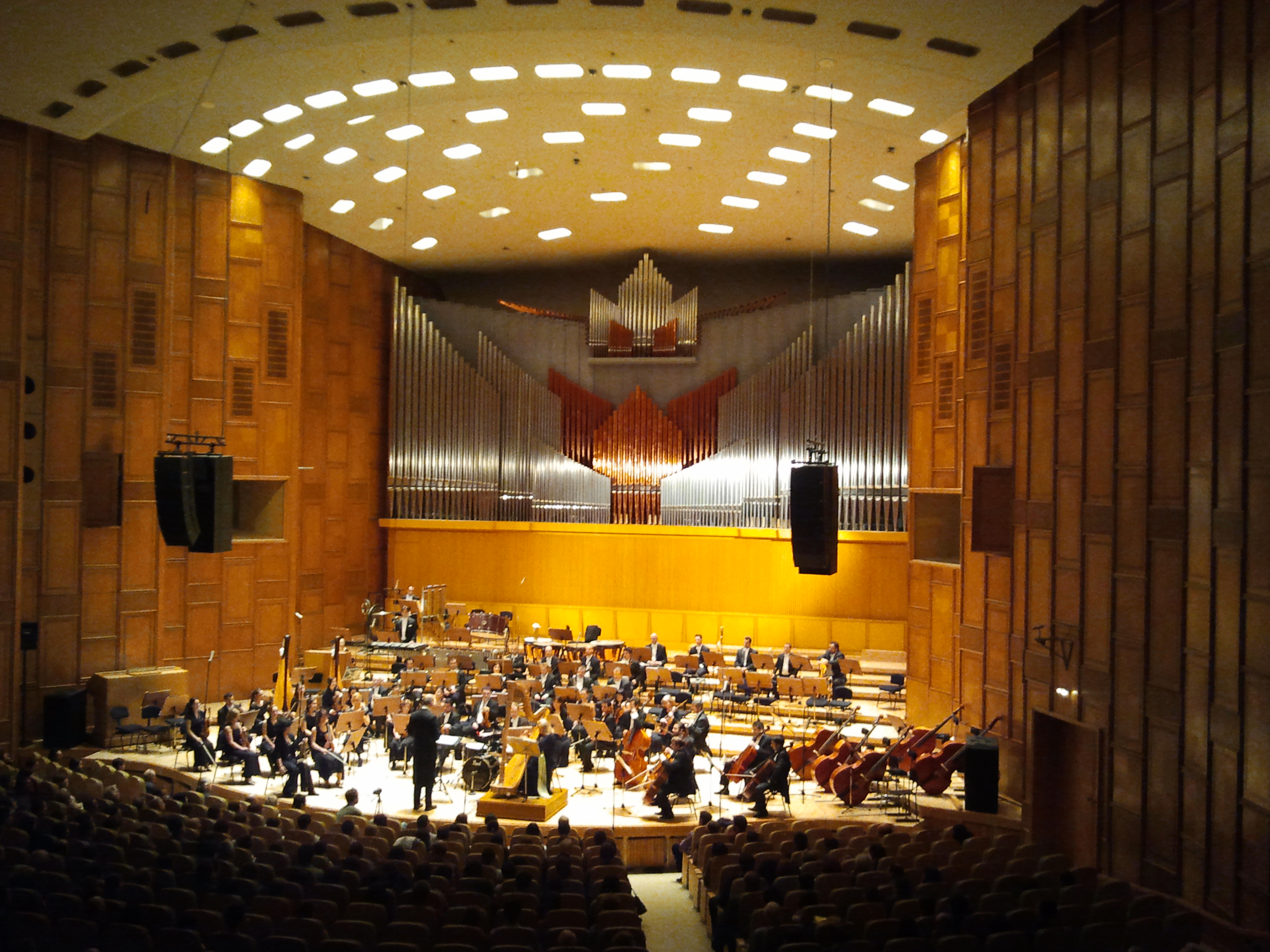
- The orchestra in 2013
- Native name: Orchestra Națională Radio
- Founded: 1928; 98 years ago
- Location: Bucharest, Romania
- Principal conductor: Tiberiu Soare
- Website: www.orchestreradio.ro

The Romanian Radio National Orchestra (Romanian: Orchestra Națională Radio) is the symphony radio orchestra, part of the Romanian Radio Orchestras and Choirs. Concerts are held during all season at the Mihail Jora Concert Studio, well known as Sala Radio (Radio Concert Hall), located in Bucharest (Romania), 60–64 General Berthelot Street.

== Chief conductors ==
- Mihail Jora
- Alfred Alessandrescu
- Theodor Rogalski
- Ionel Perlea
- Constantin Silvestri
- Iosif Conta
- Emanuel Elenescu
- Mendi Rodan
- Paul Popescu
- Horia Andreescu
- Tiberiu Soare

== International guests ==
In recent decades, the National Radio Orchestra's concerts have featured great names from the Romanian music world, as well as prestigious guests from the international music world.

Among them are the following:

- Conductors – Theodor Rogalski, Carlo Zecchi, Igor Markevitch, Ion Marin, Sascha Goetzel, Matthias Manasi, Michel Plasson, Maxim Shostakovich, Nayden Todorov, Neil Thomson, Julien Salemkour;
- Singers – Montserrat Caballé, Eliane Coelho, Ileana Cotrubaș, Ruxandra Donose, Angela Gheorghiu, Teodora Gheorghiu, Cynthia Laurence, Elena Moșuc, Placido Domingo, Luciano Pavarotti, Kamen Tchanev, Veronica Anușca, Ștefan Ignat;
- Pianists – Radu Lupu, Marta Argerich, Valentin Gheorghiu, Dan Grigore, Sviatoslav Richter, Mihaela Ursuleasa, Horia Mihail;
- Violinists – Yehudi Menuhin, Isaac Stern, David Oistrakh, Maxim Vengerov, Vadim Repin, Alexandru Tomescu;
- Cellists – Natalia Gutman, Mstislav Rostropovich, Franz Helmerson, Alexandr Rudin.
