= Jonel Perlea =

Romanian conductor

Ionel Perlea
- Born: December 13, 1900; Ograda, Ialomița County, Kingdom of Romania
- Died: July 29, 1970 (aged 69); New York City, NY, United States
- Education: University of Music and Performing Arts Munich
- Occupation: conductor

Ionel Perlea (13 December 1900 – 29 July 1970) was a Romanian conductor particularly associated with the Italian and German opera repertories.

== Biography ==
Born Ionel Perlea to a Romanian father, Victor Perlea, and a German mother, Margarethe Haberlein, in Ograda, Romania, he moved to Germany with his mother and his brothers after his father died. Perlea was five years old, or according to some sources, ten years old.

He studied in Munich, then in Leipzig. He made his debut at a concert at the Romanian Athenaeum in Bucharest in 1919, then worked as répétiteur in Leipzig (1922–23) and Rostock (1923–25). His operatic debut as conductor occurred in Cluj in 1927, when he directed Aida. The following year he made his first appearance at the Bucharest Opera, and was music director of that theatre from 1934 until 1944. He conducted several Romanian premieres of notable foreign masterpieces, such as Die Meistersinger von Nürnberg and Der Rosenkavalier. Now and then he made guest appearances in Vienna, Stuttgart, Breslau, Berlin, and Paris.

In 1944, he and his wife were arrested in Vienna, Austria, while on their way to Paris. They were held under house arrest, or according to some sources, sent to Mariapfarr concentration camp, until the end of World War II.

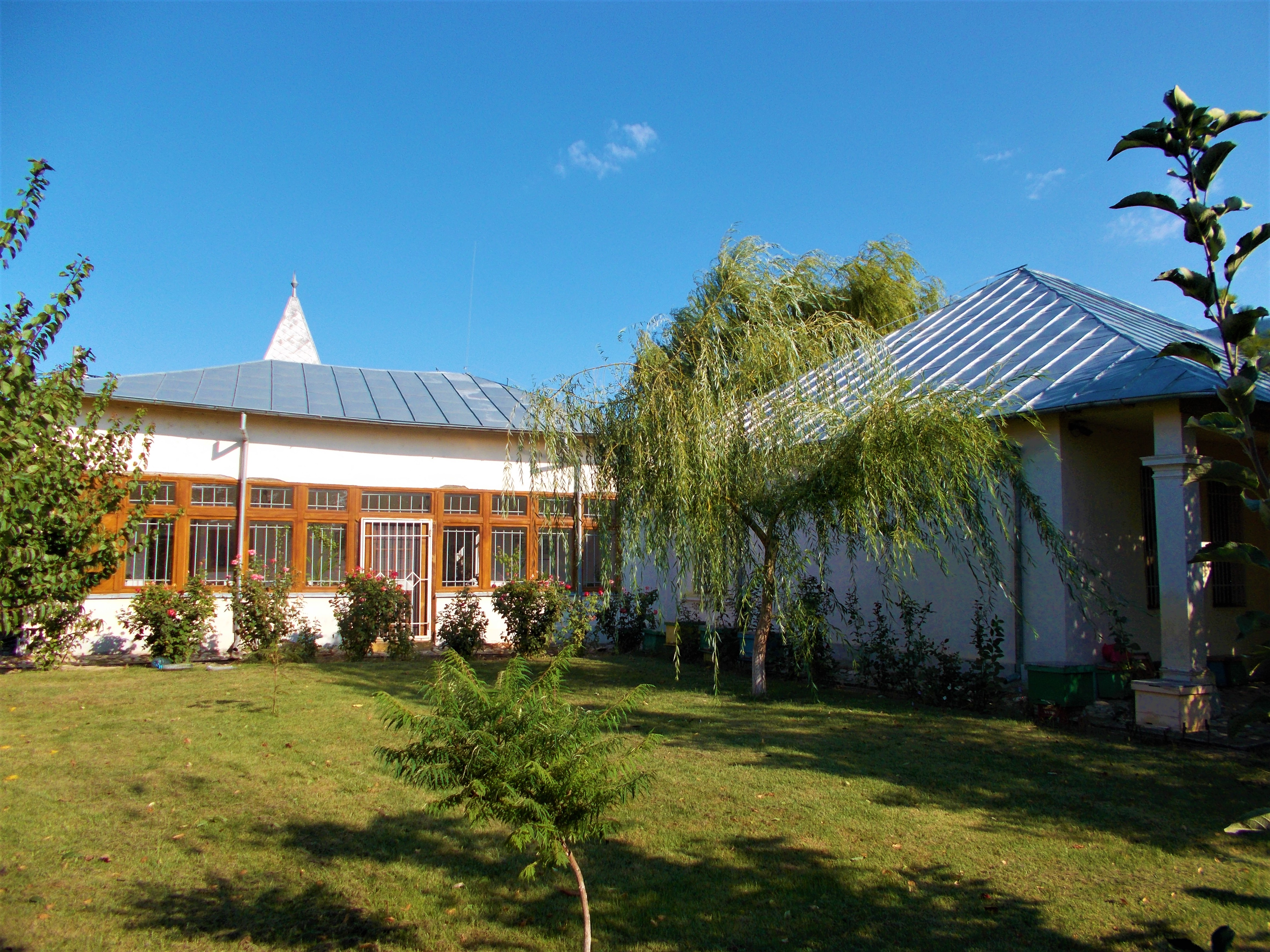
Ionel Perlea memorial house in Ograda

After the Second World War, he conducted mostly in Italy, notably at La Scala in Milan (1947–1952; his first appearance there was in Samson et Dalila). In Italy, too, he conducted several local premieres such as Capriccio in Genoa, Mazeppa and The Maid of Orleans in Florence. He championed the new opera I due timidi by Nino Rota (better known as a composer of numerous film scores). For the 1949–1950 season he was guest conductor at the Metropolitan Opera, giving performances of works such as Tristan und Isolde, Rigoletto, La traviata, and Carmen.

Following a heart attack and a stroke in 1957, he learned to conduct with his left arm only, and preferred to concentrate on giving concerts and making records. He taught at the Manhattan School of Music from 1952 to 1969.

He died in New York City in 1970, aged 69. The house where he grew up in Ograda has been turned into a memorial house. A street in Bucharest's Sector 1 is named after him.

== Selected recordings ==
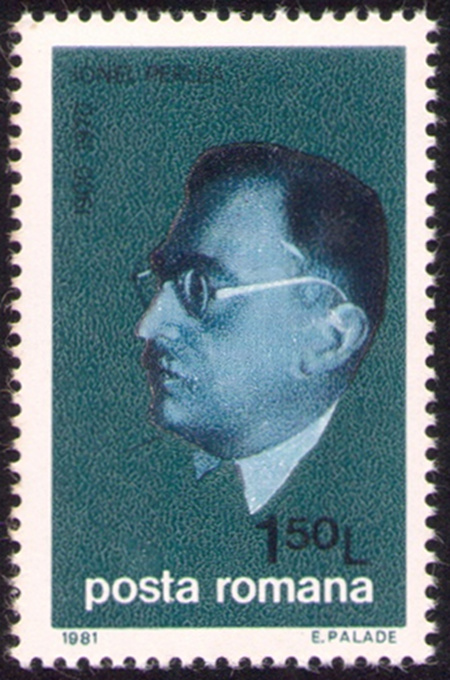
Poșta Română stamp from 1981 depicting Perlea

- 1954 – Le Nozze di Figaro – Renata Tebaldi, Italo Tajo, Scipio Colombo, Alda Noni, Giulietta Simionato, Piero de Palma – San Carlo Theater Chorus and Orchestra (Naples) – Hardy Classic
- 1954 – Manon Lescaut – Licia Albanese, Jussi Björling, Robert Merrill – Rome Opera Chorus and Orchestra – RCA Victor
- 1955 – Aida – Zinka Milanov, Jussi Björling, Fedora Barbieri, Leonard Warren, Boris Christoff – Rome Opera Chorus and Orchestra – RCA Victor
- 1956 – Rigoletto – Robert Merrill, Roberta Peters, Jussi Björling, Giorgio Tozzi – Rome Opera Chorus and Orchestra – RCA Victor
- 1966 – Lucrezia Borgia – Montserrat Caballé, Alfredo Kraus, Shirley Verrett, Ezio Flagello – RCA Italiana Opera Chorus and Orchestra – RCA Victor

Perlea also recorded for Vox during the 1950s, conducting the Bamberg Symphony Orchestra and notably leading the accompaniments in concerto recordings of artists such as Gaspar Cassadó, Guiomar Novaes, and Friedrich Wührer.

== Sources ==
- Le guide de l'opéra, Mancini & Rouveroux, (Fayard, 1986) ISBN 2-213-01563-5
