= Bibescu =

Coat of arms of Princes Bibescu

The House of Bibescu or Bibesco is an old Romanian noble family, whose members were once ruling Princes of Wallachia.

== History ==
The Princely Bibescu family was of Wallachian origin, first documented in the 15th century, and has marked the political and economic development of the country through many generations.

== Princes Stirbey ==
Prince Barbu Dimitrie Știrbei was the son of Boyar Dumitrache Bibescu, Palatine of Wallachia (1772–1831), and his wife, Ecaterina Văcărescu (1777–1842). He was adopted by his relation, one of the most prestigious Oltenian, Vornic Barbu C. Știrbei, the last of the Știrbey line of the family, who left him heir to his wealth and also the family name. Upon the adoption, this line of the Bibescu family became House of Stirbey.

After the Revolution of 1848, in difficult times, Prince Barbu Stirbey (1799–1869) was elected Reigning Prince (“Domnitor”) of Tara Romaneasca, and sought balanced relationships with the Ottoman Empire, the Austro-Hungarian Empire, and the Russian Empire, thus setting the foundations for an independent state. Under his rule (1849–1856), Tara Romaneasca went from a feudal and agriculture-based country to an enlightened nation, with its first industrial enterprises, a modern educational system and a well-developed road network.

== Notable members ==
- Antoine Bibesco (1878–1951), Romanian aristocrat, lawyer, diplomat and writer
- Elena Bibescu (1855–1902), Romanian noblewoman and pianist, mother of Antoine
- Elizabeth Bibesco (1897–1945), English writer and socialite, wife of Antoine
- George Valentin Bibescu (1880–1941), Romanian aviation pioneer and automobile enthusiast
- Gheorghe Bibescu (1804–1873), Prince of Wallachia
- Marițica Bibescu (1815–1859), Princess-consort of Wallachia, wife of Gheorghe
- Marthe Bibesco (1886–1973), Romanian-French writer and socialite
