= Mogoșoaia Palace =

Palace in Mogoșoaia, Romania

Coordinates: 44°31′39.65″N 25°59′33.77″E

Mogoșoaia Palace Palatul Mogoșoaia
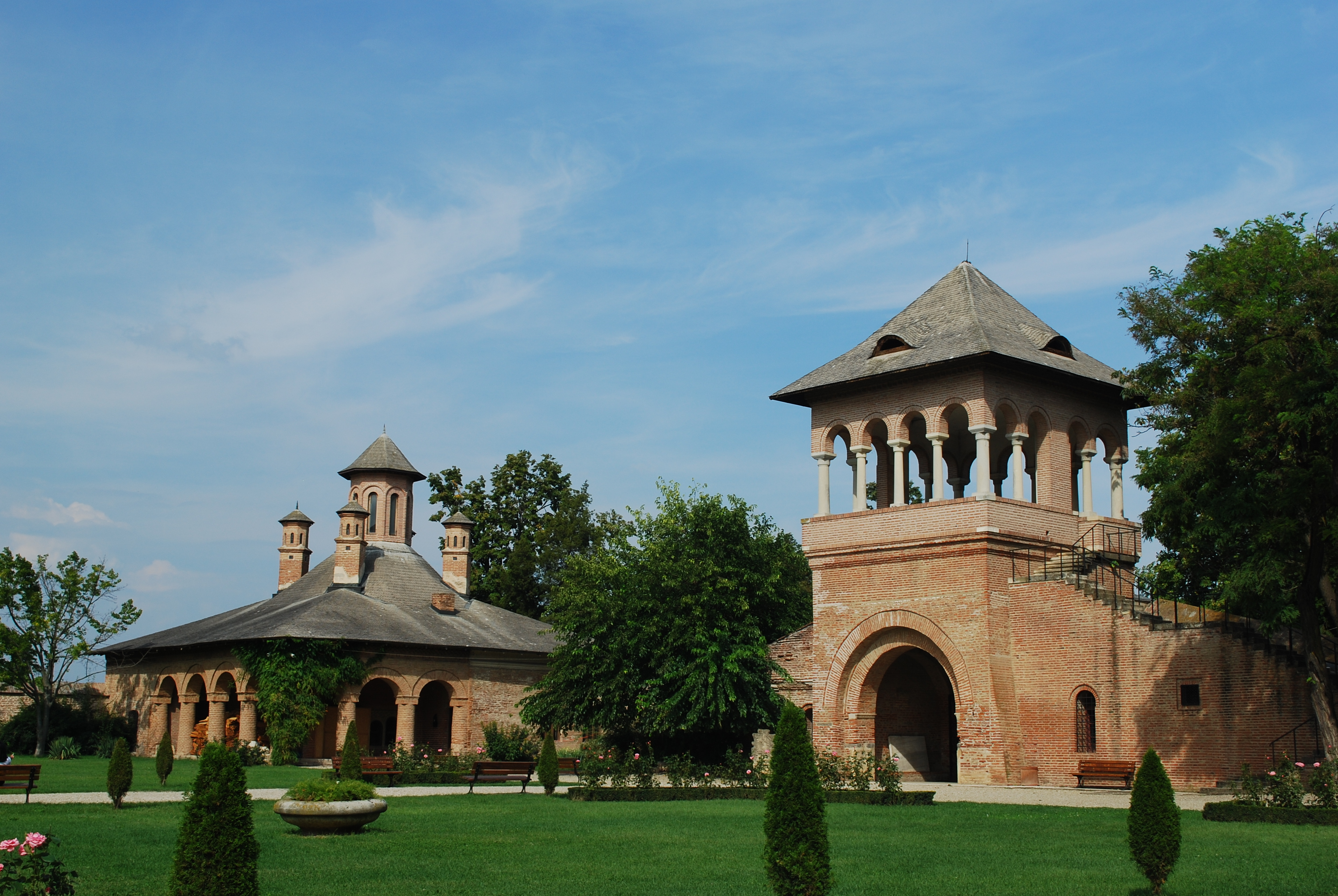
- Interactive map of the Mogoșoaia Palace; Palatul Mogoșoaia area

General information
- Architectural style: Brâncovenesc style
- Location: Mogoșoaia, Romania
- Construction started: 1698
- Completed: 1702

Mogoșoaia Palace (Romanian: Palatul Mogoșoaia, pronounced [paˈlatul moɡoˈʃo̯aja]) is situated about 10 kilometres (6.2 mi) from Bucharest, Romania. It was built between 1698 and 1702 by Constantin Brâncoveanu in what is called the Romanian Renaissance style or Brâncovenesc style. The palace bears the name of the widow of the Romanian boyar Mogoș, who owned the land it was built on.

== History ==
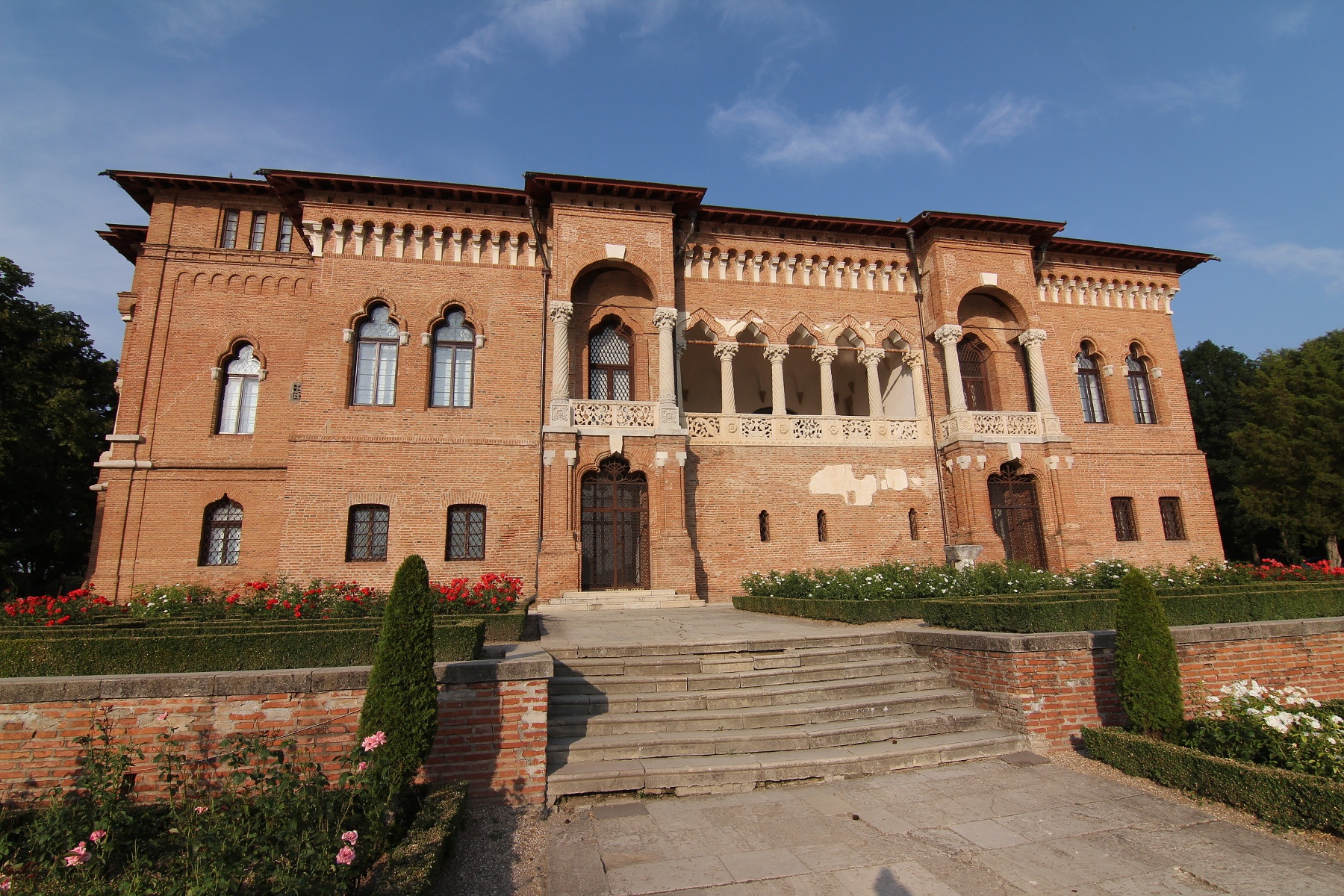

After 1714, when Constantin Brâncoveanu was executed with his entire family in Constantinople, all the family's wealth was confiscated by the Ottomans and the palace was converted into an inn. Rebought by Prince Ștefan Cantacuzino, he returned it to Brâncoveanu's grandson Constantin, and remained with the family until the early nineteenth century.

The palace was devastated by the Ottomans during the Russo-Turkish War of 1768–1774. It was later granted by prince Grigore to his daughter, Zoe Mavrocordat, who had married George D. Bibescu, sovereign Prince of Wallachia. The palace remained within Bibescu family and was renovated by Nicolae Bibescu.

In November 1916, during the Romanian Campaign of World War I, the palace at Mogoșoaia was bombed by the German air forces. Bought from Marie-Nicole by her cousin (and head of the princely house), Prince George Bibesco, the palace was given to his wife, Princess Martha. He later deeded the land to her, too. Martha spent her private fortune for the reconstruction. In the late 1920s and the 1930s, the palace became the meeting place for politicians and for the international high society. When Prince George died in 1941, he was buried in the small, white 1688 church on the grounds of the palace.

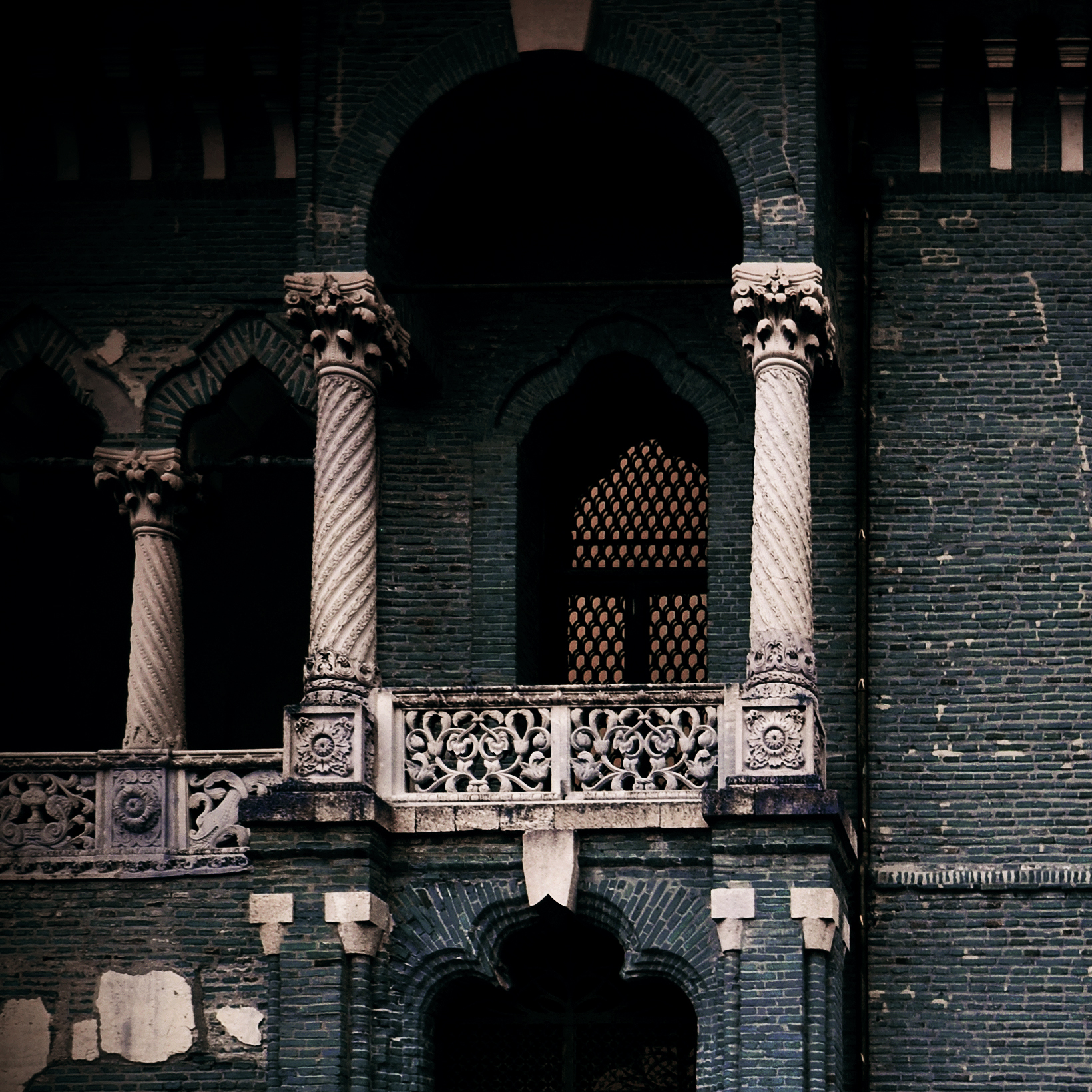
Brâncovenesc architectural style

During World War II, Prince Antoine Bibesco (a cousin of George Bibesco) and his wife Elizabeth Bibesco refused to flee the country. When Elizabeth died of pneumonia on April 7, 1945, she was buried in the Bibesco family vault on the grounds of Mogoșoaia. Neither Elizabeth Bibesco's husband, Antoine, nor George Bibesco's wife, Martha, could be buried beside them, as they both died during the Communist regime. After 1945, the palace was forcibly nationalized by the communist authorities, and the owners, Valentina and Dimitrie Ghika-Comănești, were arrested. Some of its precious art collections disappeared during this period. In 1957, it eventually became a museum.

The palace is now a popular tourist destination, but although the grounds and gardens are beautiful, the interior of the palace itself is under reconstruction and presently houses a museum and art gallery (Muzeul de Artă Brâncovenească).

The exterior and tunnels of the complex were featured in 2018 film The Nun.

== Gallery ==
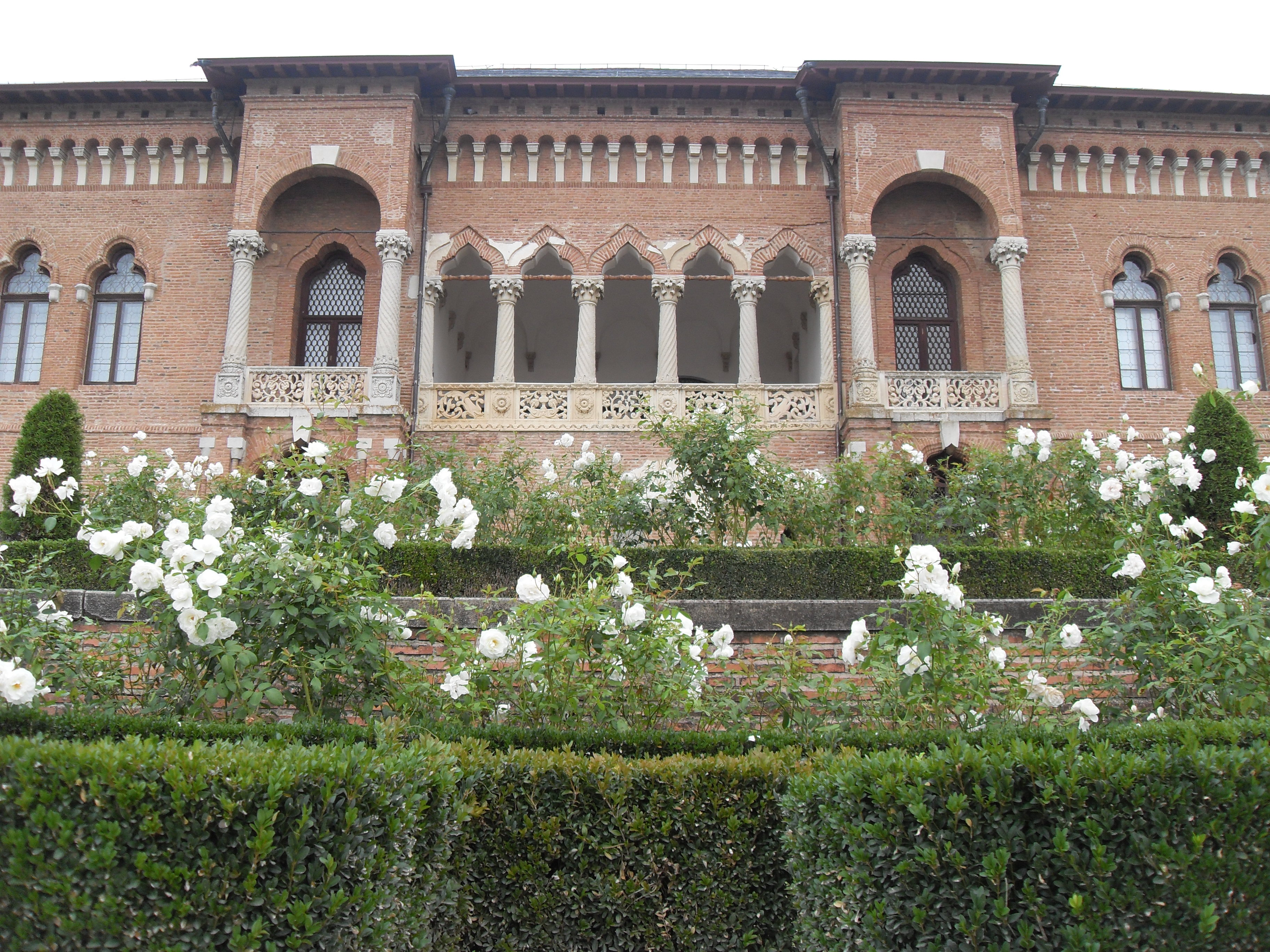

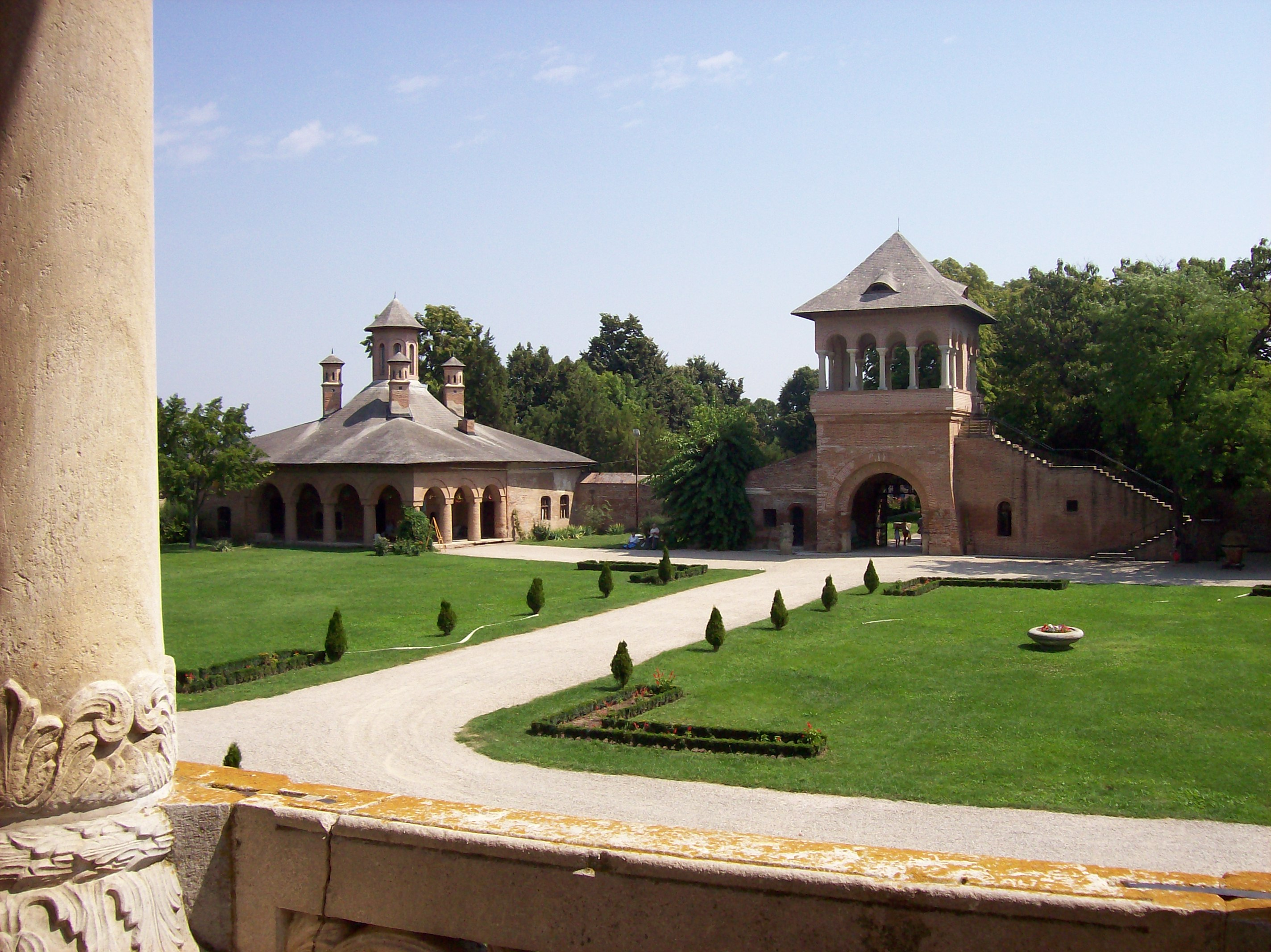
View of the entrance

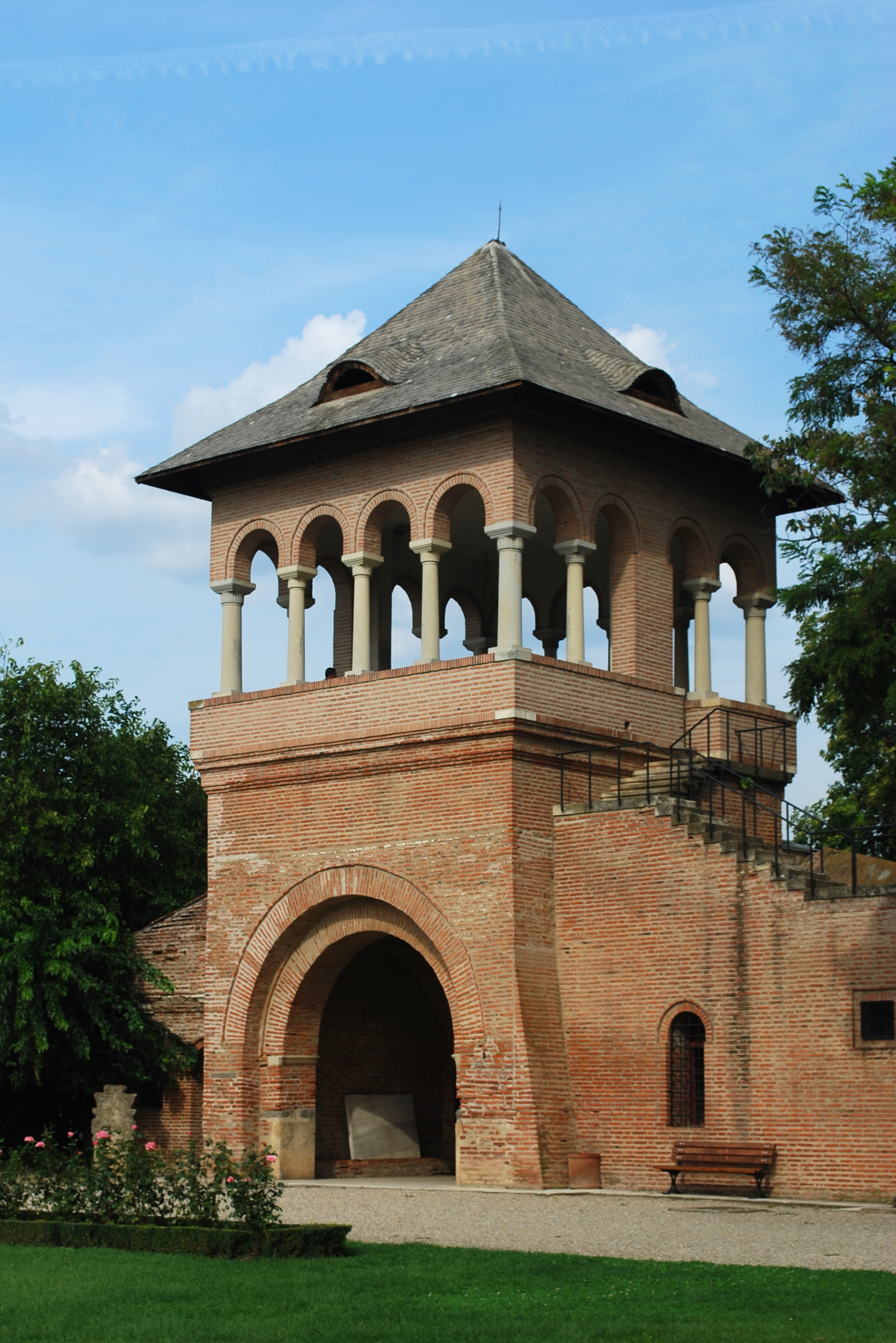

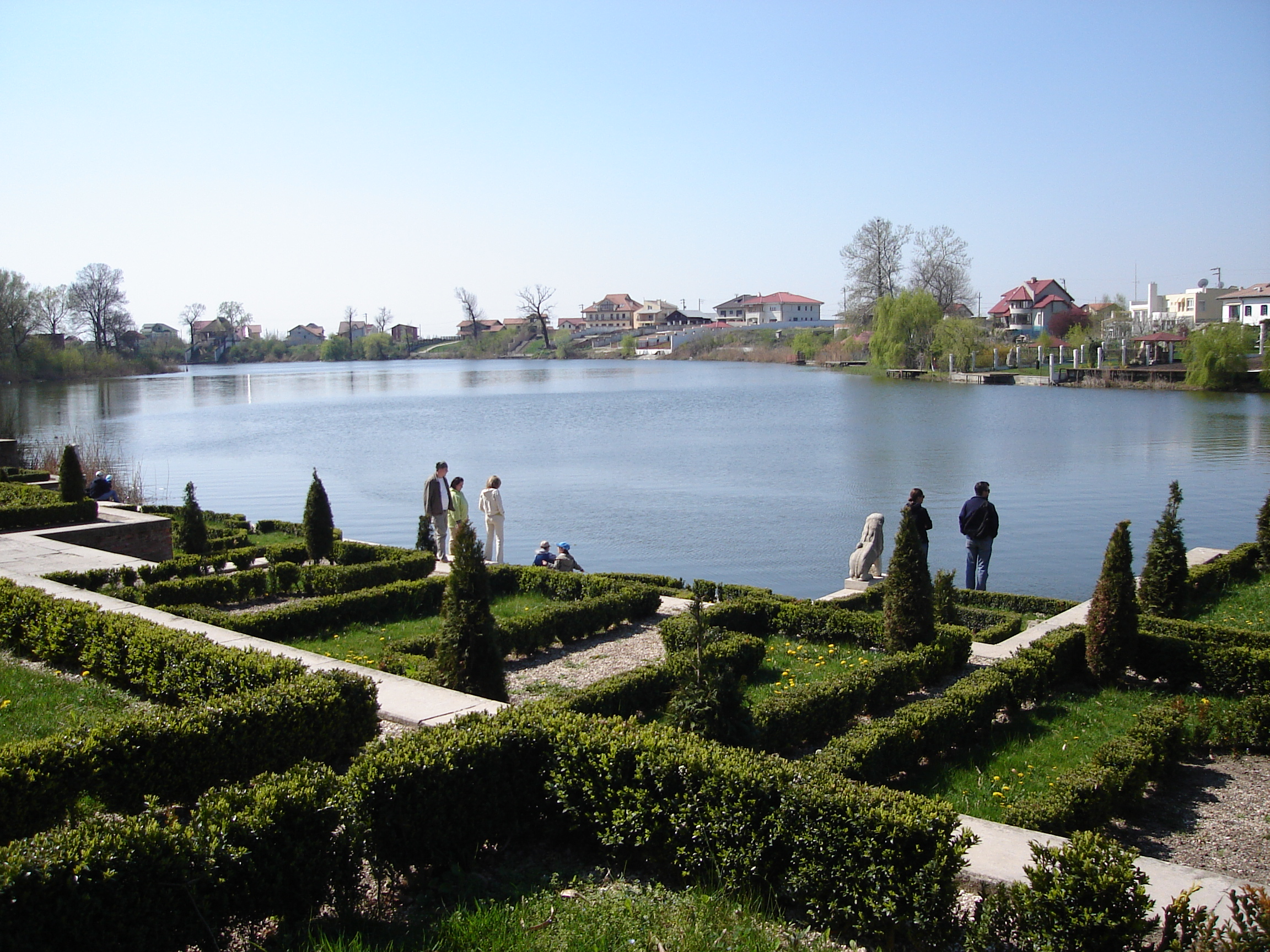

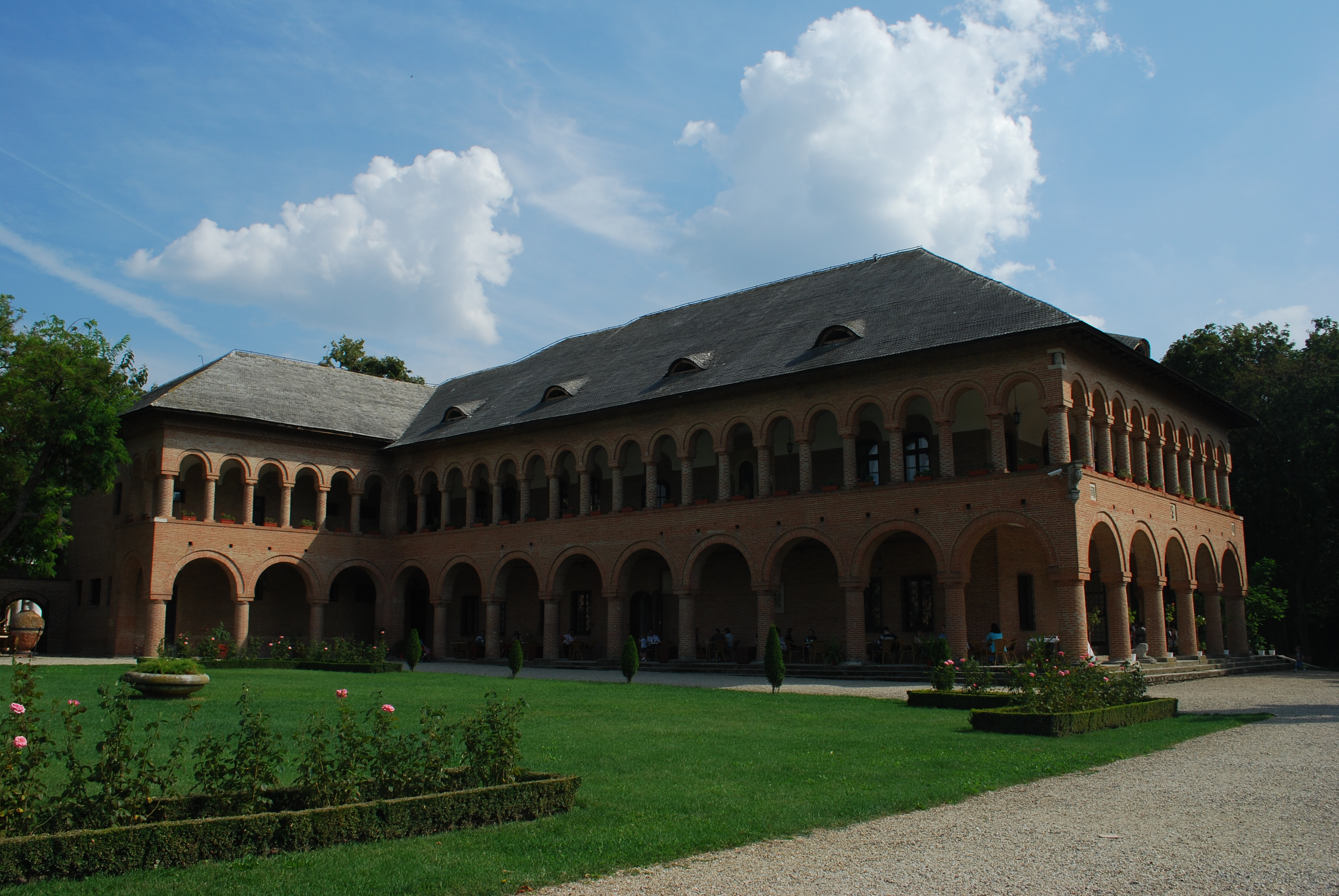
Mogoșoaia Guest House

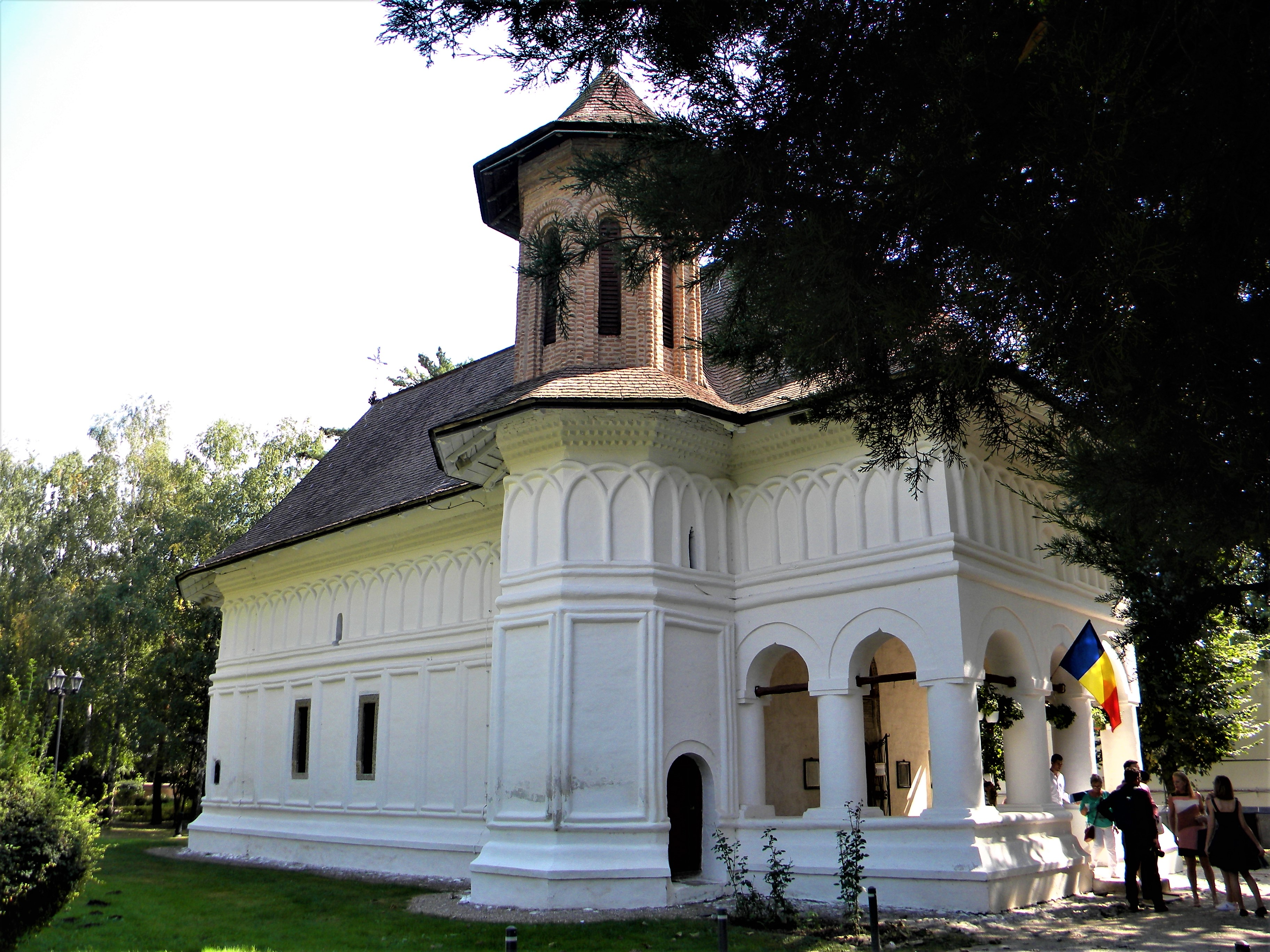
Mogoșoaia church

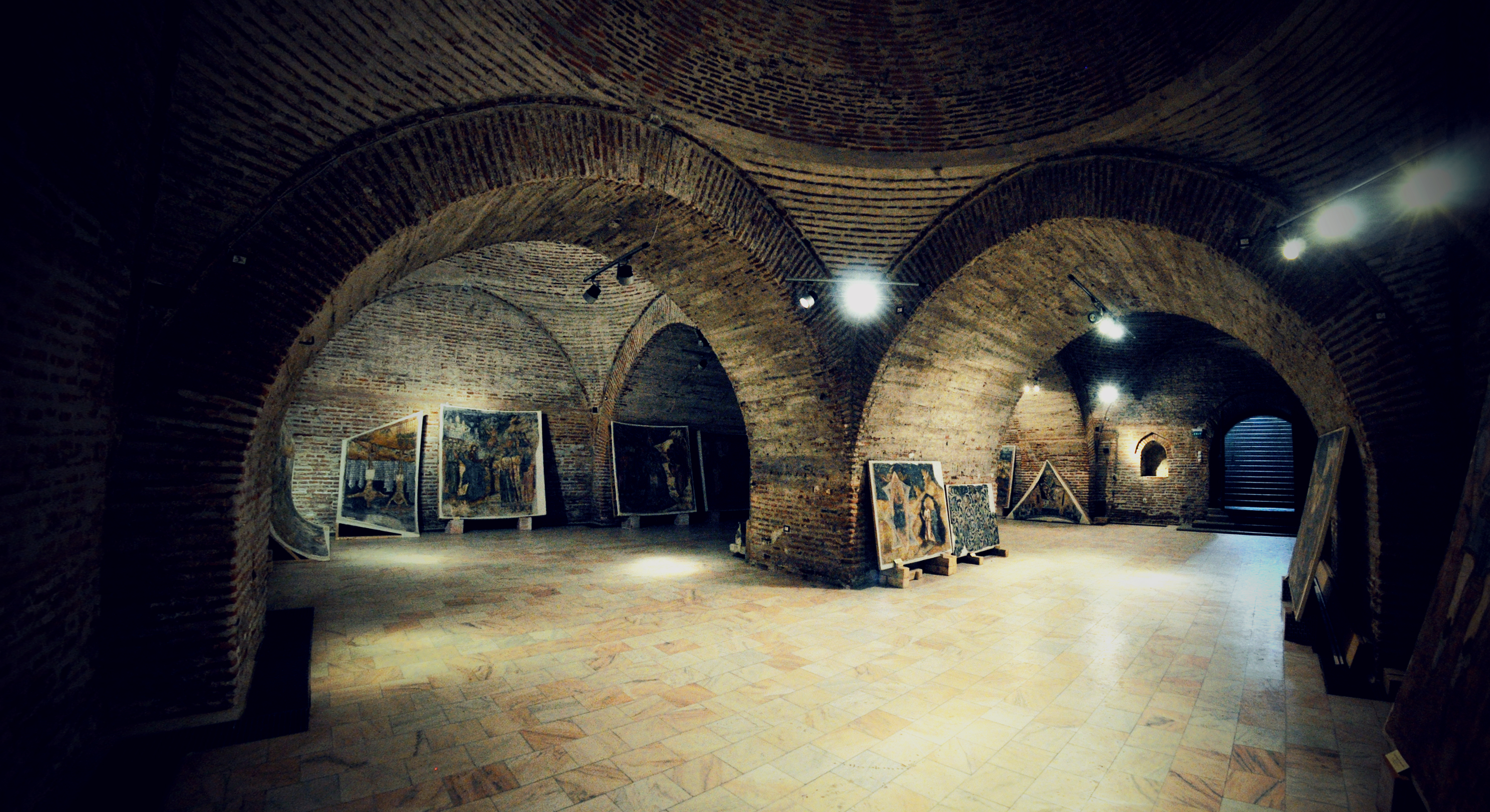

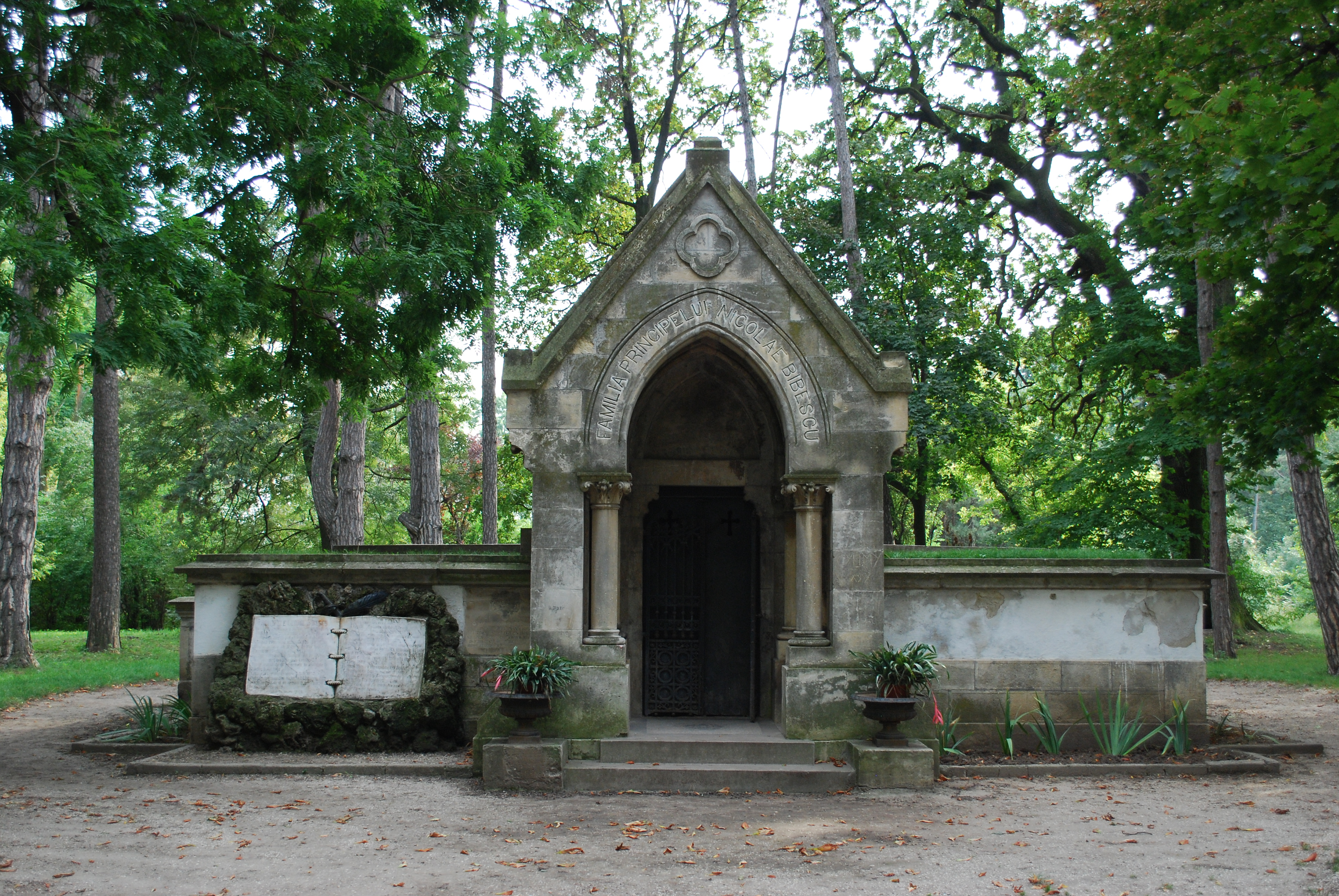

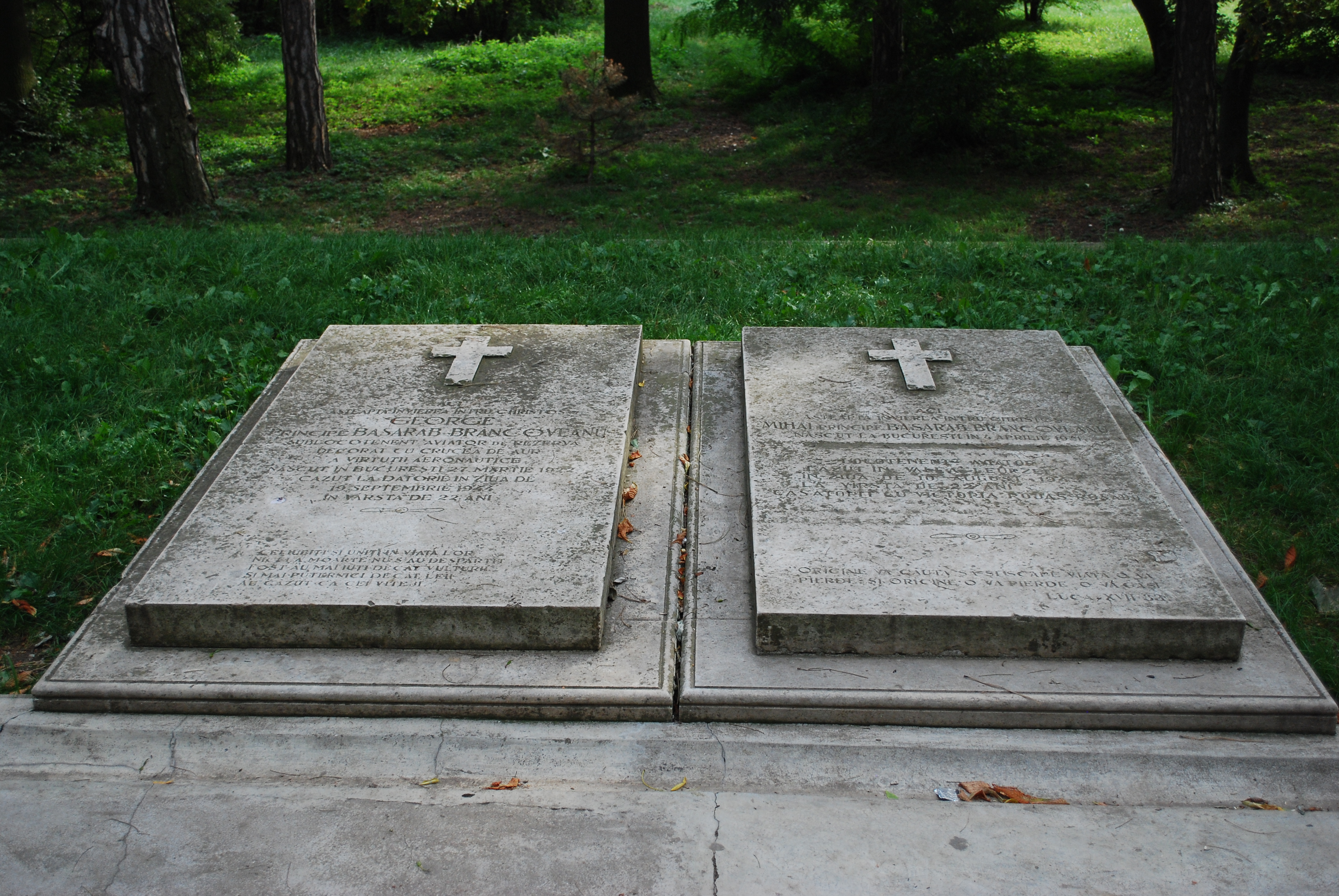

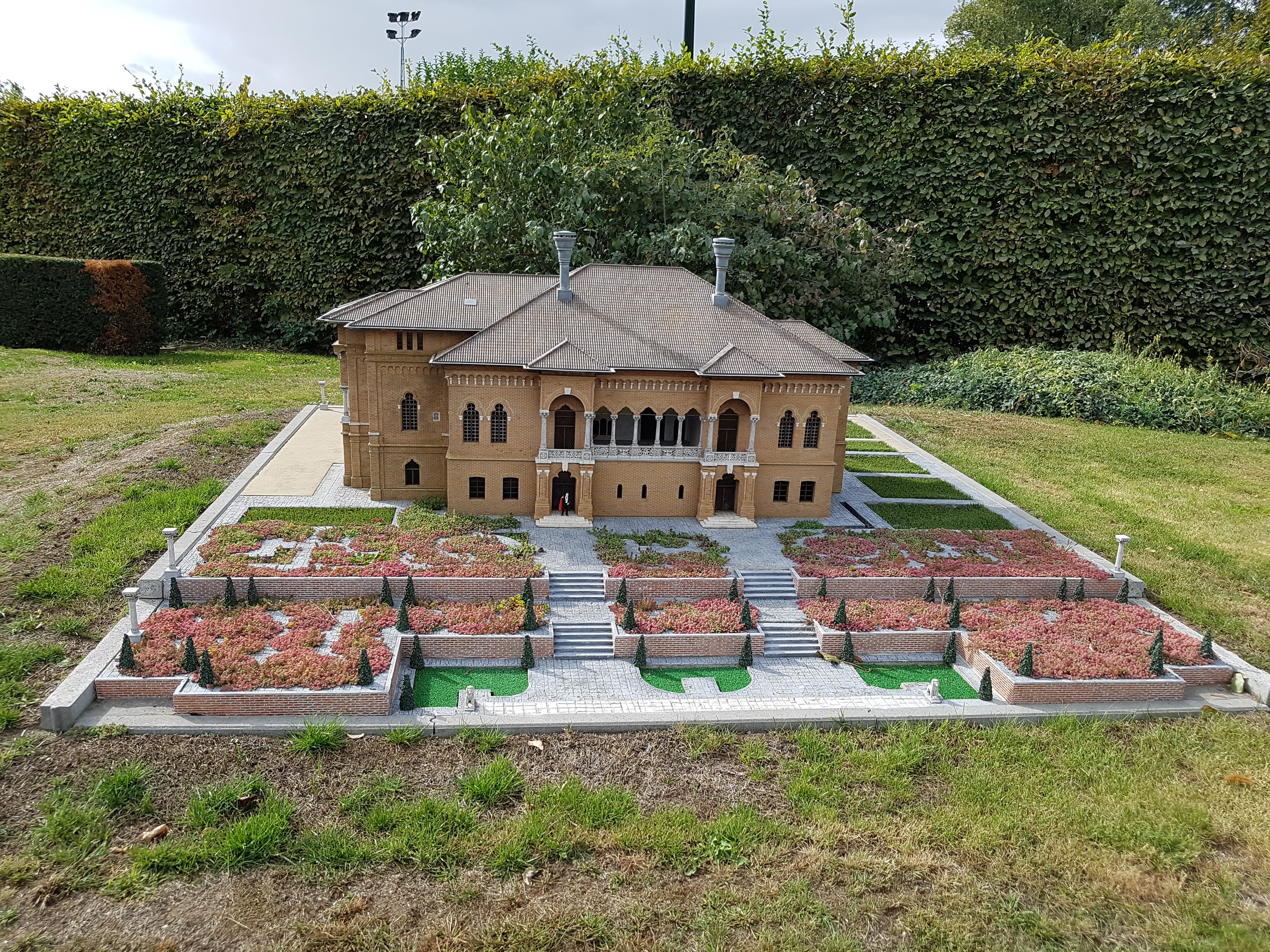
Miniature of Mogosoaia palace at Mini-Europe
