= Vox Maris =

Vox maris, Op. 31, is a symphonic poem composed between 1929 and 1954 by the Romanian composer George Enescu, dedicated to the memory of the great Romanian pianist Elena Bibescu.

Enescu did not live to hear this work in concert: the première was given in Bucharest on 10 September 1964, by the Romanian Radio-Television Symphony Orchestra, conducted by Iosif Conta.
