= Știrbei =

Coat of arms of Princes Stirbey

The House of Știrbei, Știrbey or Stirbey is an old Romanian noble family, whose members were once ruling Princes of Wallachia. The Princely Stirbey family was of Wallachian origin, first documented in the 15th century. It was involved in the political and economical development of Romania, through many generations.

== History ==
The family emerged in the 19th century as a collateral branch of the House of Bibescu. Prince Barbu Dimitrie Știrbei was the son of boyar Dumitrache Bibescu, Palatine of Wallachia (1772–1831), and his wife, Ecaterina Văcărescu (1777–1842). He was adopted by his relation, one of the most prestigious Oltenian boyars, Vornic Barbu C. Știrbei, the last of the Știrbey line, who made him heir to his wealth and also family name. Upon the adoption, this line of the Bibescu family became the Stirbey Princes.

After the Revolution of 1848, Prince Barbu Stirbey (1799–1869) was elected Reigning Prince (“Domnitor”) of Wallachia, and sought balanced relationships with the Ottoman Empire, the Austrian Empire and the Russian Empire, This laid the foundations for an independent state. Under his rule (1849–1856), Wallachia went from a feudal and agriculture-based country to a modern nation, with its first industries, a modern educational system and a well-developed road network.

The House of Știrbei is extinct in the male line. Their heirs today are German Counts Wolff-Metternich zur Gracht.

== Notable members ==
- Alexandru B. Știrbei (1837–1895), Finance Minister of Romania (1891)
- Barbu Dimitrie Ştirbei (1796 or 1801–1869), Prince of Wallachia (1848–1853, 1854–1856)
- Barbu Ştirbey (1873–1946), Prime Minister of Romania (1927)
- Elisa (née Știrbei) Brătianu (1870-1957) politician and conservationist
- George Barbu Ştirbei (1832–1925), Foreign Minister of Romania (1866–1867)

== Properties ==
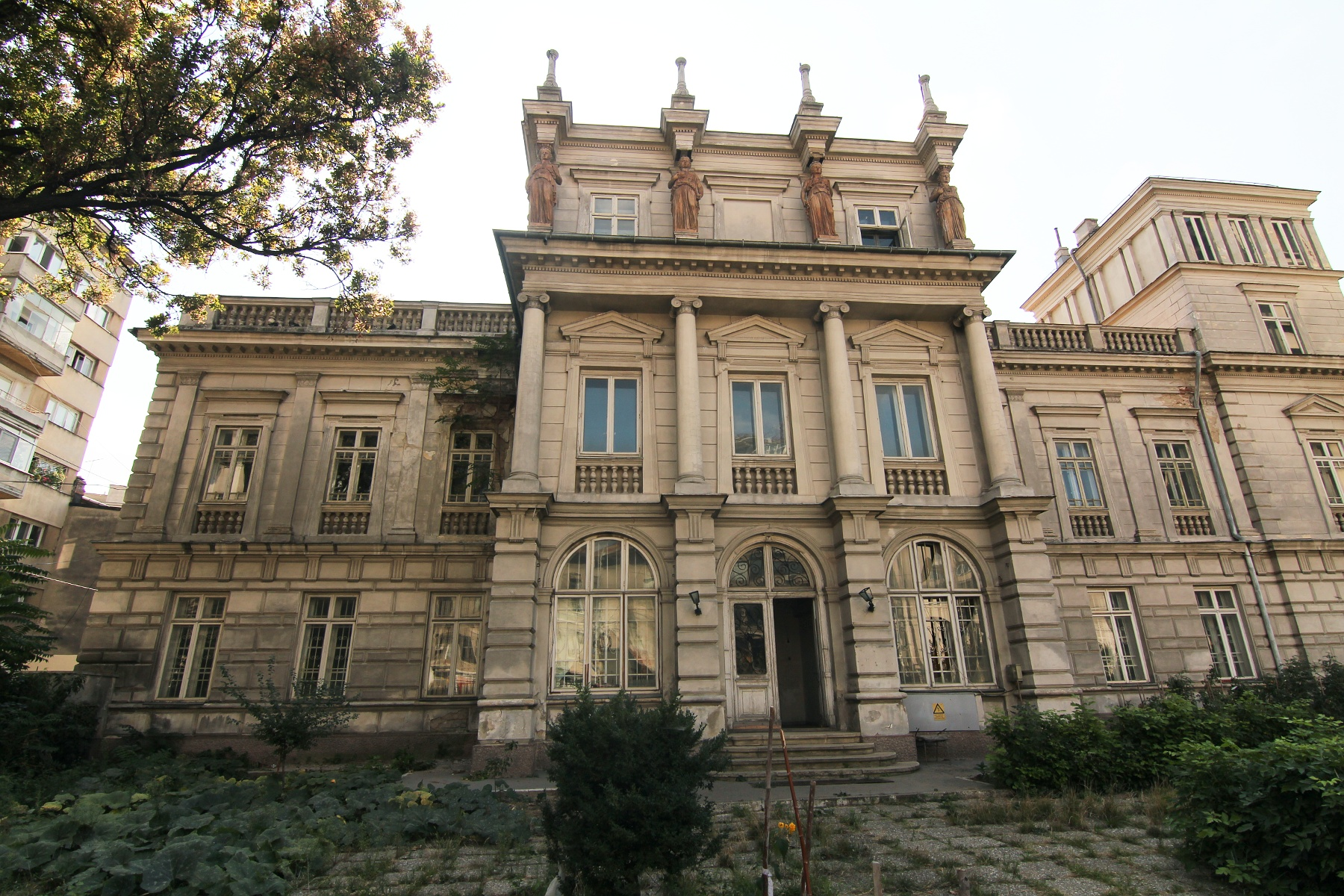
Știrbey palace in Bucharest

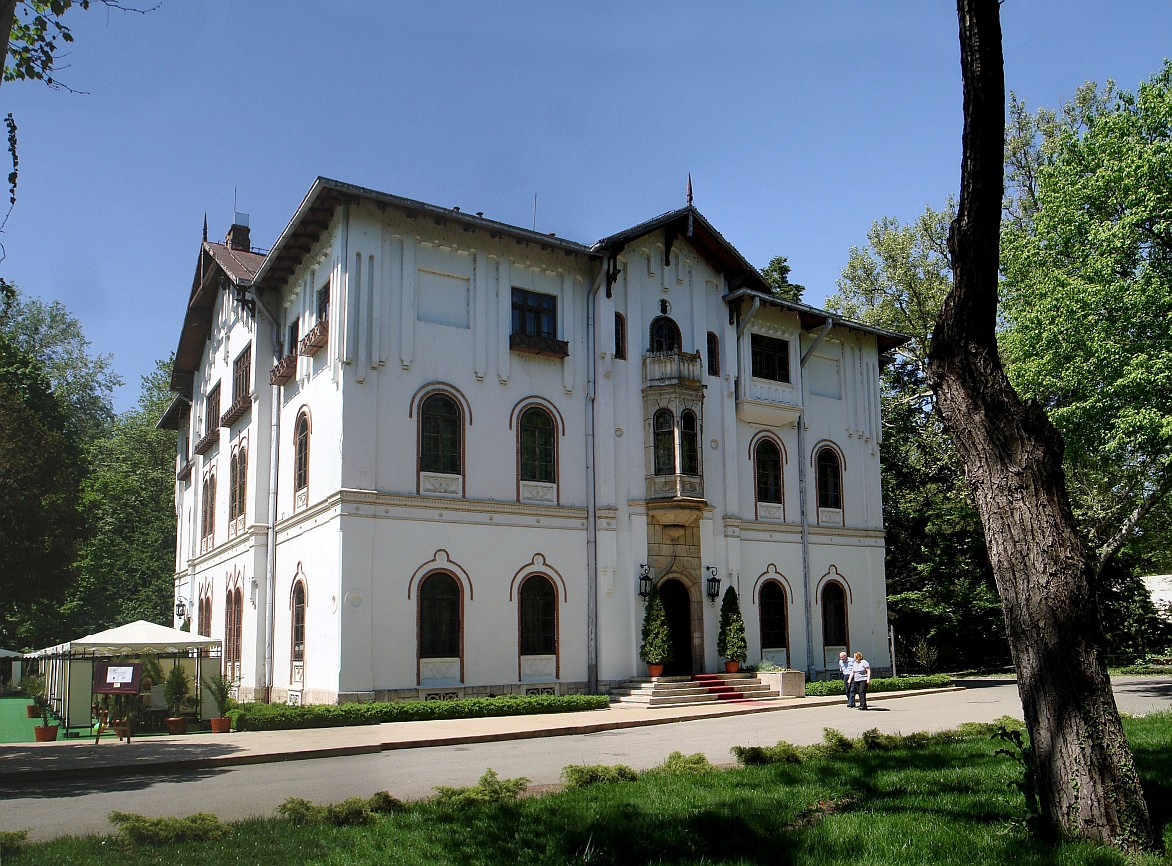
Știrbey palace in Buftea
