= Elizabeth Bibesco =

English writer and socialite

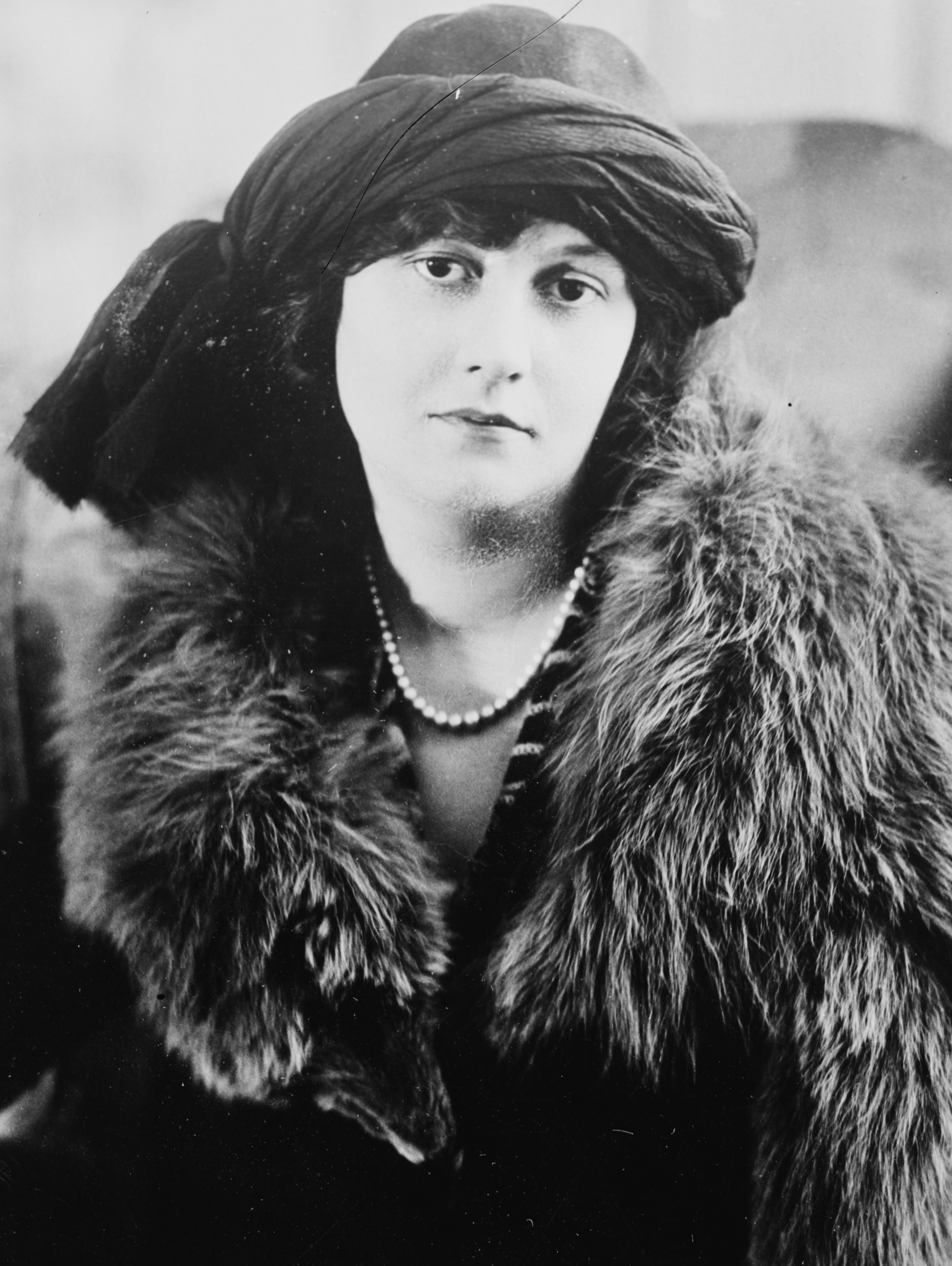
- Elizabeth Asquith Bibesco, circa 1919
- Born: Elizabeth Charlotte Lucy Asquith; 26 February 1897; London, England, UK
- Died: 7 April 1945 (aged 48); Bucharest, Kingdom of Romania
- Resting place: Mogoșoaia, Romania
- Other names: Elizabeth Asquith; Elizabeth Bibesco
- Occupations: Actress, writer, novelist
- Years active: 1921–1940
- Spouse: Antoine Bibesco (1919–1945)
- Children: 1
- Parents: H. H. Asquith (father); Margot Asquith (mother)

Elizabeth, Princess Bibesco (born Elizabeth Charlotte Lucy Asquith; 26 February 1897 – 7 April 1945) was an English socialite and a writer between 1921 and 1940. She was the daughter of H. H. Asquith, who would become the British prime minister from 1908 to 1916, and Margot Asquith, and the wife of Antoine Bibesco, a Romanian prince and diplomat. She drew on her experience in British high society in her short stories and novels. A final posthumous collection of her stories, poems and aphorisms was published under the title Haven in 1951, with a preface by Elizabeth Bowen.

== Childhood and youth ==
Elizabeth Charlotte Lucy Asquith was the first child of H. H. Asquith (British prime minister, 1908–1916) and his second wife, Margot Tennant. According to her mother's 1920 autobiography, she was a precocious child of uncertain temper.

Life as the Prime Minister's daughter thrust her into the public eye at an early age and she developed a quick wit and a social presence beyond her years. At the age of 12 she asked George Bernard Shaw to write a play to be produced by her for a charity benefit. He wrote The Fascinating Foundling, which she directed with other children as actors.

When she was just 14, The Times wrote that "many members of the House have made the acquaintance of Miss Asquith and in expressing their concern for her health, have referred to her charm of manner and to the interest which she has begun already to show in political matters." As a teenager, during World War I, she was given opportunities to do "good works", organising and performing in "matinees" for the servicemen. Her first known literary effort was a short duologue called "Off and On" which she performed with Nelson Keys in 1916 at the Palace Theatre. In the same year she organised a large show of portraits by John Singer Sargent at the Grafton Galleries to aid the Art Fund and a "Poets' Reading" in aid of the Star and Garter Fund. In 1918, she played small roles in two silent war movies by D.W. Griffith, Hearts of the World and The Great Love.

== Marriage and travels ==
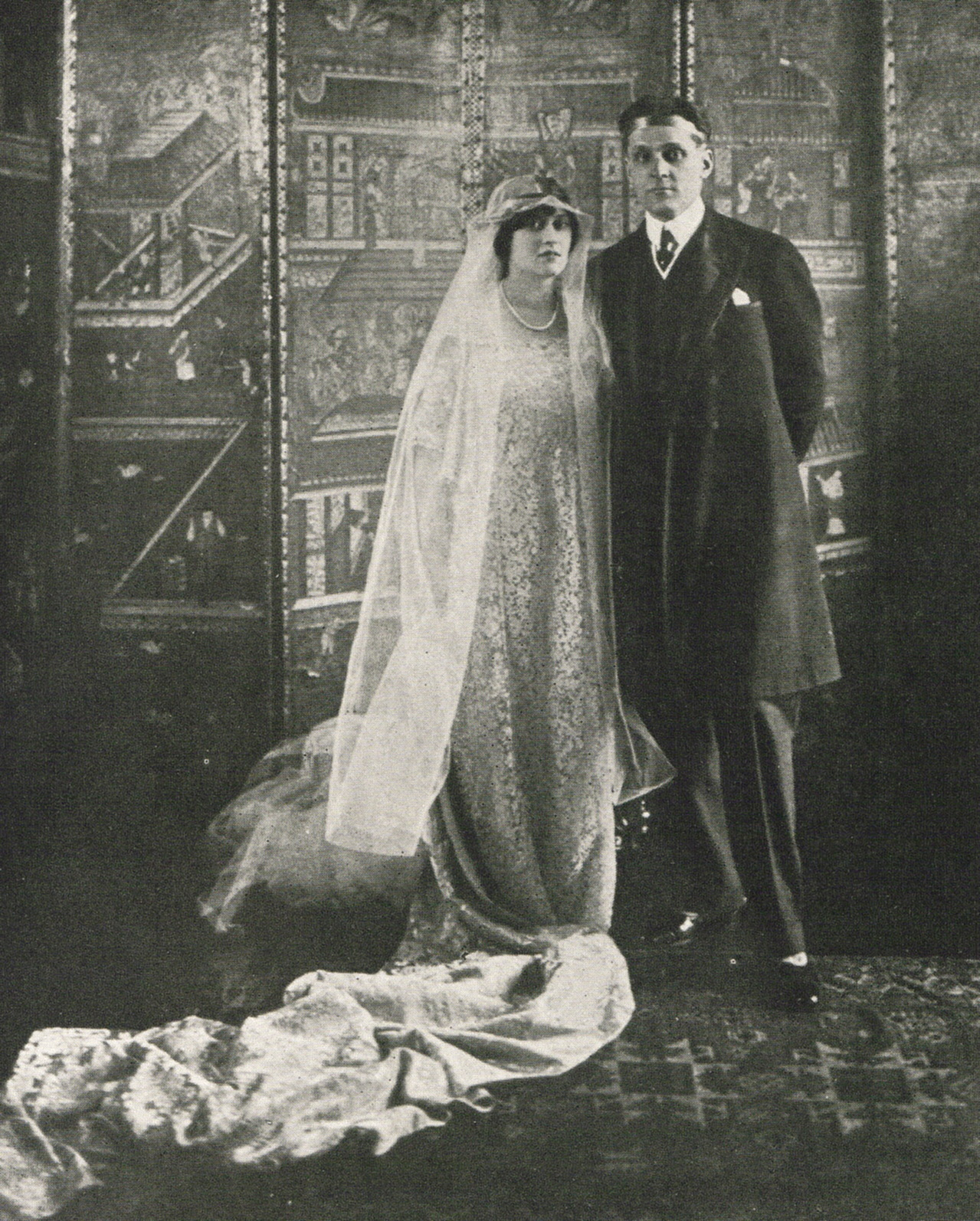
Elizabeth and Antoine Bibesco's wedding, 1919

On 29 April 1919, she married Prince Antoine Bibesco, member of the House of Bibescu and a Romanian diplomat stationed in London, a man 19 years her senior. Taking place at St. Margaret's, Westminster, it was the society wedding of the year, attended by everyone from Queen Mary to George Bernard Shaw. The wedding was filmed by the newly formed British Moving Picture News organization. After the marriage, Prince and Princess Bibesco lived in Paris at the Bibesco townhouse at 45, Quai Bourbon at the tip of the Île St-Louis looking up the river toward Notre Dame cathedral. The walls of the apartment were decorated with huge canvases by Édouard Vuillard. "They weren't pictures. They were gardens into which you walked through a frame," wrote Enid Bagnold.

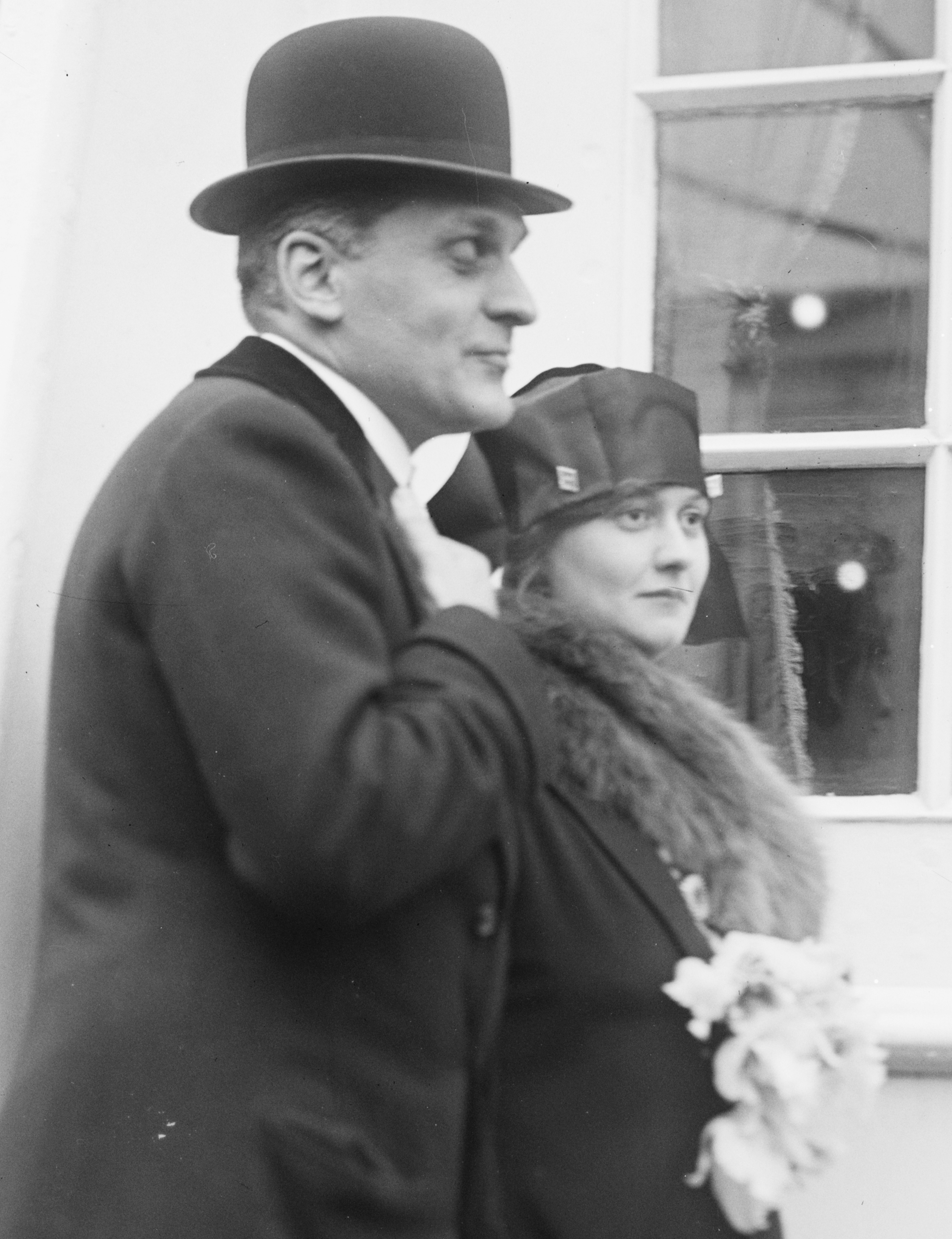
Prince Antoine and Elizabeth Bibesco

Antoine Bibesco was a lifelong friend of Marcel Proust and after his marriage to Elizabeth she too became a favourite of the reclusive writer. At the time of her marriage Proust wrote that she "was probably unsurpassed in intelligence by any of her contemporaries," and added that "she looked like a lovely figure in an Italian fresco". He would leave his house late at night to visit them, to discuss Shakespeare with Elizabeth or to gossip with Antoine until dawn. Elizabeth wrote a moving obituary for Proust in the November 1922 New Statesman. "Gently, deliberately, he drew me into that magic circle of his personality with the ultimate sureness of a look that needs no touch to seal it. Insensibly you were drawn into that intricate cobweb of iridescent steel, his mind, which, interlacing with yours, spread patterns of light and shade over your most intimate thoughts." Elizabeth also travelled with her husband in his capacity as Romanian ambassador, first to Washington, D.C. (1920–1926) and then to Madrid (1927–1931).

Their only child, Priscilla Helen Alexandra Bibesco, later Hodgson, was born in London in 1920; she died in Paris in 2004.

== Writings ==
Between 1921 and 1940, Bibesco published three collections of short stories, four novels, two plays and a book of poetry. Katharine Angell, reviewing Balloons for The Nation in 1923 wrote, "Elizabeth Bibesco uses for her sketches material from which Katherine Mansfield would have made short stories, and Henry James, novels ... Elizabeth Bibesco has a genius for compression – the compression into a few phrases of all the details of a situation, into a few pages of the hopes and failures of a lifetime". Her collections of short stories were reviewed on both sides of the Atlantic and her novel The Fir and the Palm was serialised in The Washington Post in November and December 1924.

Bibesco's last novel, The Romantic, published in 1940, starts with a dedication to Falange Española founder Jose Antonio Primo de Rivera, whom Bibesco had known during her stay in Madrid where her husband was Romanian ambassador (1927–31): "To Jose Antonio Primo de Rivera. I promised you a book before it was begun. It is yours now that it is finished -- Those we love die for us only when we die--". A thorough appraisal of Bibesco's work was written by Elizabeth Bowen in an introduction to Haven, the 1951 posthumous collection of Bibesco's stories, poems and aphorisms. In her essay, Bowen wrote that, "The Bibesco characters seem to be the inhabitants of a special milieu, in which the more ordinary taboos of feeling and brakes on speech do not operate."

== Final years ==
Elizabeth was in Romania during World War II and died there of pneumonia in 1945, aged 48. She was buried in the Bibesco family graveyard on the grounds of Mogoșoaia Palace outside Bucharest. Her epitaph reads, "My soul has gained the freedom of the night" – the last line of the last poem in her 1927 collection. Her death was the final sorrow for her mother, Margot, who died within months of her daughter's death. Prince Antoine, forced out of Romania after the war, never returned to his homeland. He died in 1951 and was buried in Paris. Priscilla Hodgson, the couple's only child, continued to live at 45, Quai Bourbon until her death in 2004.

== Portraits ==
Elizabeth Bibesco, by Augustus John, 1924

Elizabeth's portrait was painted twice by Augustus John, in 1919 and again five years later. The first painting (titled "Elizabeth Asquith") shows her as a vivacious debutante in a feather stole over bare shoulders. This picture is in the Laing Art Gallery in Newcastle upon Tyne, England. In the second portrait, seen at right (titled "Princess Antoine Bibesco"), Elizabeth appears slightly weary and melancholic, her eyes averted just enough to suggest a break in her former self-confidence. She wears a mantilla given to her father by the Queen of Portugal and holds one of her own books. When shown at the Royal Academy summer show in 1924, Mary Chamot, writing in Country Life, wrote of this painting that it "has the force to make every other picture in the room look insipid, so dazzling is the contrast between the mysterious darkness of her eyes and hair and the shimmering brilliance of the white lace she wears over her head."

== Selected works ==
- I Have Only Myself to Blame, 1921 – short stories
- Balloons, 1922 – short stories
- The Painted Swan, 1922 – play
- The Fir and the Palm, 1924 – novel
- The Whole Story, 1925 – short stories
- There is No Return, 1927 – novel
- Points of View, 1927 – play
- Poems, 1927 – poetry
- Portrait of Caroline, 1931 – novel
- The Romantic, 1940 – novel
