= Antoine Bibesco =

Romanian aristocrat & diplomat (1878–1951)

Prince Antoine Bibesco
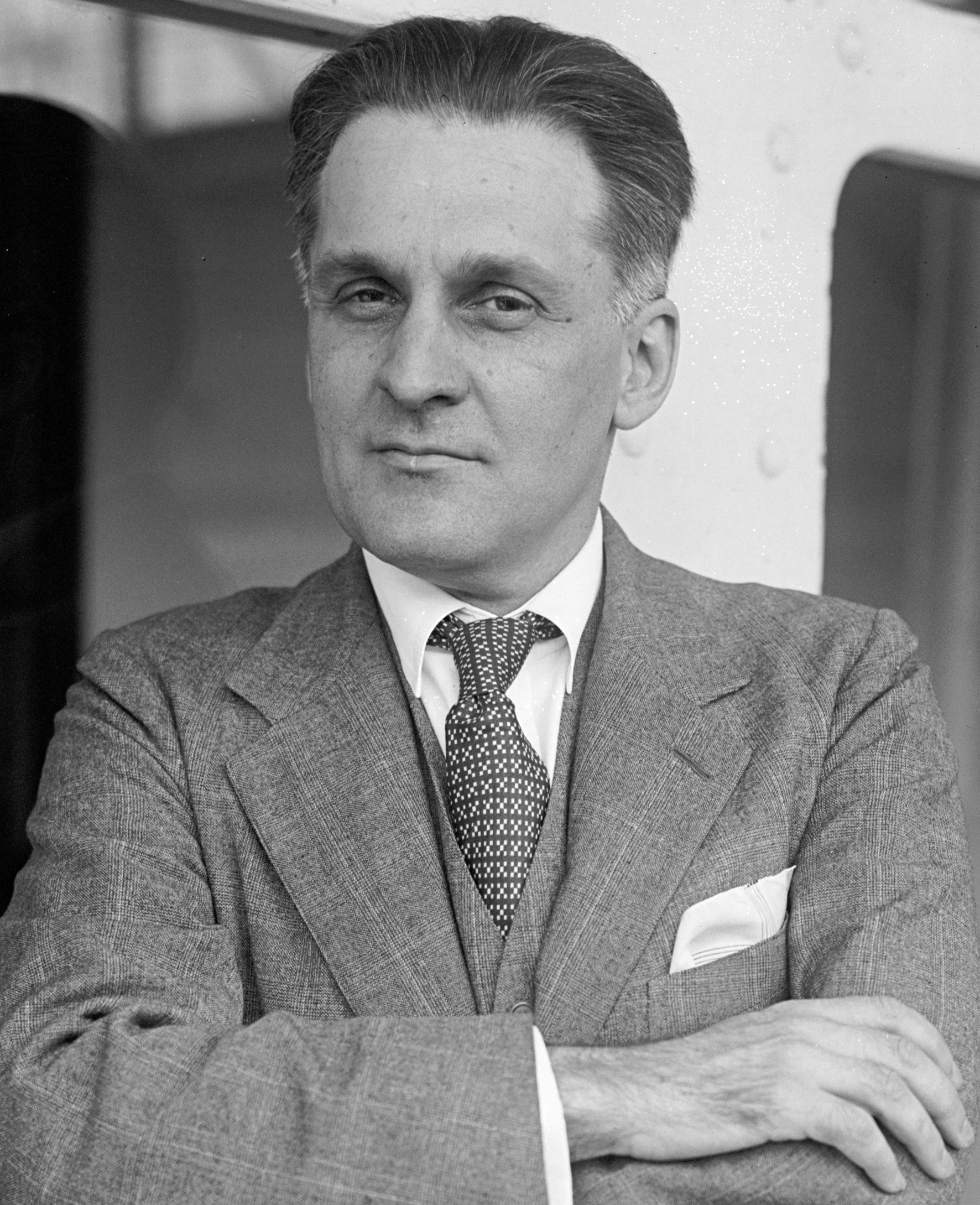

Envoy Extraordinary and Minister Plenipotentiary of Romania in the United States
- In office February 25, 1921 – February 24, 1926
- Prime Minister: Alexandru Averescu; Take Ionescu; Ion I. C. Brătianu
- Preceded by: N. H. Lahovary
- Succeeded by: F. Nano

Envoy Extraordinary and Minister Plenipotentiary of Romania in Spain
- In office 1927–1931
- Prime Minister: Vintilă Brătianu; Iuliu Maniu; Gheorghe Mironescu

Personal details
- Born: July 19, 1878 Paris
- Died: September 2, 1951 (aged 73)
- Resting place: Paris
- Spouse: Elizabeth Asquith (m. 1919; died 1945)
- Children: Priscilla Bibesco (1920–2004)
- Parent(s): Alexandre Bibesco; Elena Epureanu
- Relatives: Gheorghe Bibescu (grandfather); Manolache Costache Epureanu (grandfather); Grégoire Bibesco-Bassaraba (uncle); Léon de Montesquiou (cousin); Anna de Noailles (cousin); George Valentin Bibescu (cousin); Herbert Asquith (brother-in-law); Arthur Asquith (brother-in-law); Violet Bonham Carter (sister-in-law); Cyril Asquith (brother-in-law); Anthony Asquith (brother-in-law)
- Profession: Diplomat

Prince Antoine Bibesco (Romanian: Prințul Anton Bibescu; July 19, 1878 – September 2, 1951) was a Romanian aristocrat, lawyer, diplomat, and writer.

== Early life and education ==
He was born as the son of Prince Alexandre Bibesco, the last surviving son of the Duke of Wallachia and his wife, Elena Epureanu, daughter of Manolache Costache Epureanu, former Prime Minister of Romania. Though raised at 69, Rue de Courcelles, in Paris, Antoine continued to oversee the Bibesco estates in Craiova until after World War II.

== Career ==
As a young man, his mother, Princess Hélène Bibesco's celebrated Paris salon gave him the opportunity to meet Charles Gounod, Claude Debussy, Camille Saint-Saëns, Pierre Bonnard, Édouard Vuillard, Aristide Maillol, Anatole France, and Marcel Proust among many other notables. Both his father and mother commissioned artworks and music (most notably Edgar Degas and George Enescu) and Antoine continued this family tradition, particularly through his friendship with Vuillard.

Marcel Proust became a lifelong friend and shared a secret language in which Marcel was Lecram and the Bibescos were Ocsebib. Antoine made a concerted effort to have Proust's Du Côté de Chez Swann (in which, it is said, Bibesco was the model for Robert de St. Loup) published by André Gide and the Nouvelle Revue Française, but failed in that effort. Toward the end of Proust's life, Bibesco, who was a great raconteur, was an outside ear for the reclusive writer. Later he published Letters of Marcel Proust to Antoine Bibesco.

Bibesco, though not a prolific writer, was the author of a number of plays in French and had at least one American success. In 1930 his play Ladies All was performed on Broadway at the Morosco Theatre, running for 140 performances. He also translated Weekend by Noël Coward and Le Domaine by John Galsworthy into French.

== Diplomatic career ==
Having earlier served as counsellor of the Romanian legations in Paris and Petrograd, by 1914, Prince Antoine was First Secretary of the Romanian Legation in London and by 1918 had entered the circle of H. H. Asquith (former Liberal Prime Minister). At this time he was in a relationship with the writer Enid Bagnold, but his affections for her were replaced by those he began to feel for the twenty-one-year-old Elizabeth Asquith (he was 40 at the time).

Margot Asquith, her mother, thought he would be a steadying influence on her daughter. "What a gentleman he is. None of my family are gentlemen like that; no breeding you know," she wrote.

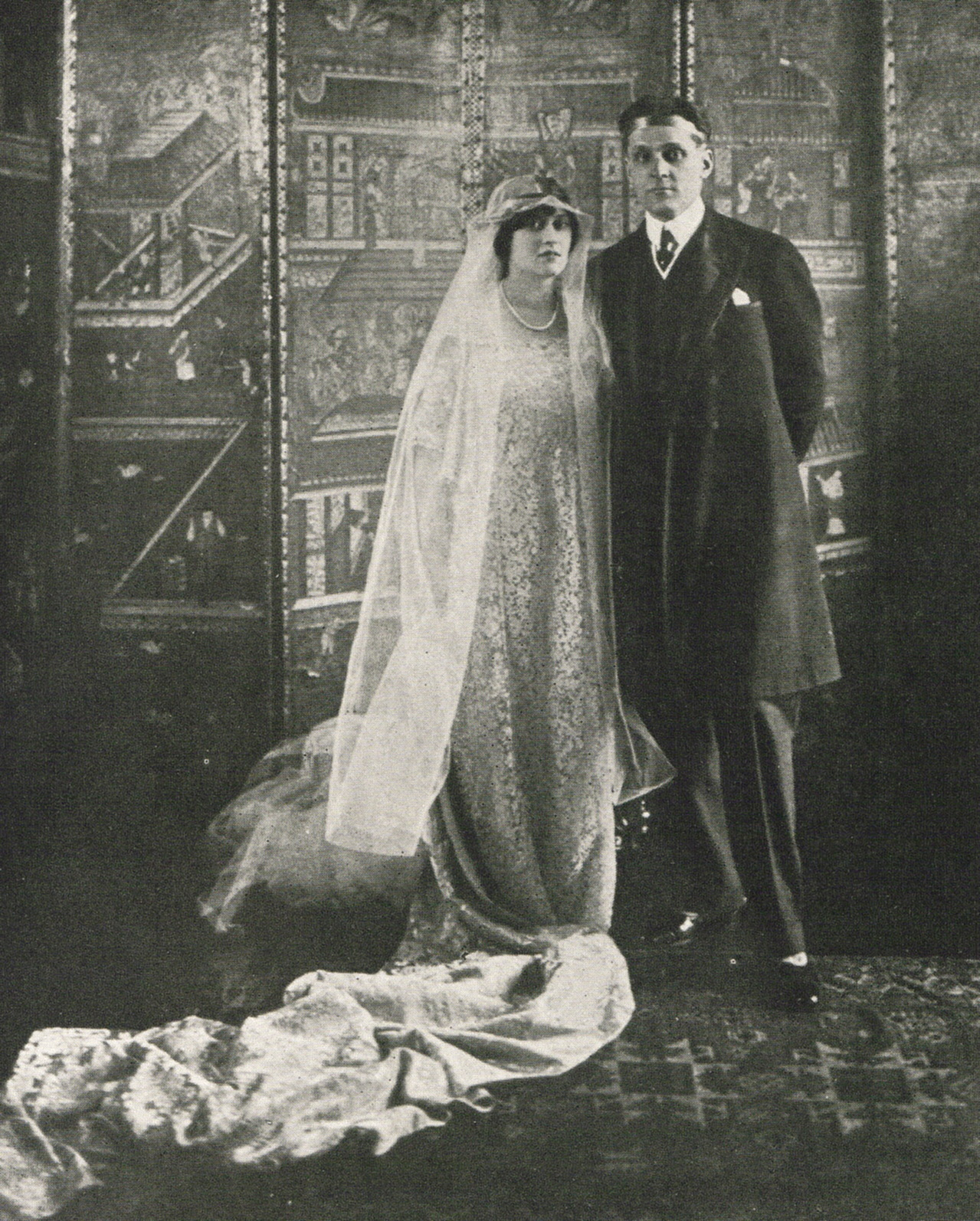
Prince and Princess Bibesco, 1919

The marriage took place at St Margaret's, Westminster on 29 April 1919. It was the society event of the year, attended by everyone from Queen Alexandra to George Bernard Shaw. Their only child, Priscilla, was born in London 1920; she died in Paris in 2004.

Apparently marriage did not change Antoine's womanizing ways. Rebecca West (with whom he had a short affair in 1927) called him "a boudoir athlete". While attending a party at the French embassy in London and looking around the room, West realized that every woman in attendance had been his mistress at one time or another.

Antoine continued his diplomatic career in Washington, D.C. (1920–1926) as Minister of the Romanian Legation (the present Embassy of Romania in Washington, D.C. was first used as such during his tenure) and in Madrid (1927–1931).

In 1936, after Romanian Prime Minister Gheorghe Tătărescu removed Nicolae Titulescu as Foreign Minister and recalled nearly all Romania's diplomats, Prince Bibesco had the unenviable responsibility of reassuring the United Kingdom and France that Romania was not slipping into the grip of fascism.

== Later life and death ==
The World War II years were spent in Romania where his wife died (in 1945) and when, after the war, his estates were confiscated by the communists he left his country, never to return. Bagnold, in her autobiography, tells of unwittingly smuggling silver across the English Channel for him after the war. He died in 1951 and was buried in Paris.

"He had three tombs in his heart", Enid Bagnold wrote in her Times obituary, "which I think he could never finally close—of his mother, his brother Emmanuel and his wife."
