= Elena Bibescu =

Romanian noblewoman and pianist

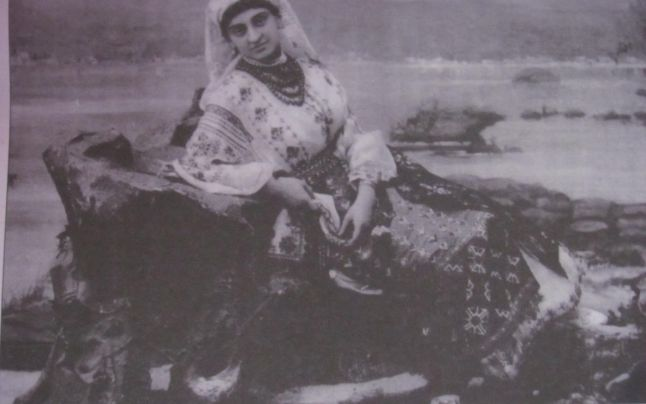
- Princess Elena Bibescu in a Romanian national costume
- Born: Elena Epureanu; 1855; Bârlad, Tutova County, Moldavia
- Died: 18 October 1902 (aged 46–47); Iași, Kingdom of Romania
- Education: Vienna Conservatory
- Occupation: Pianist
- Spouse: Alexandru Bibescu
- Children: Antoine Bibesco; Emmanuel Bibesco; Hélène Bibesco
- Father: Manolache Costache Epureanu

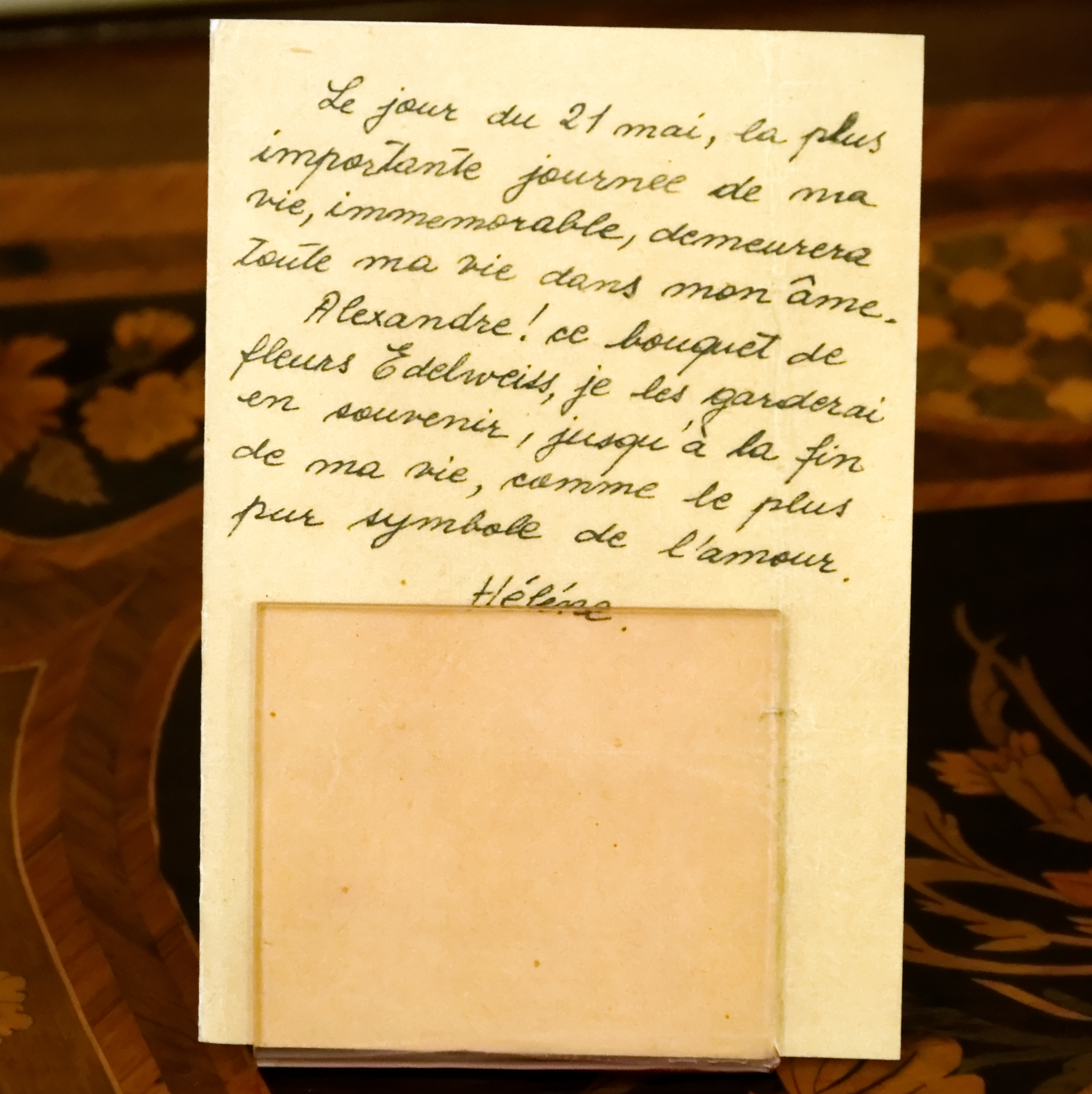
Letter from Elena to Alexandru Bibescu

Princess Elena Bibescu (Romanian pronunciation: [eˈlena biˈbesku]; 1855 – October 18, 1902) was a Romanian noblewoman and pianist, regarded as one of the greatest pianists of Europe in the nineteenth century.

In France, she became well known as an outstanding pianist, and a protector of culture. Princess Bibescu held, for three decades, one of the most prestigious salons of Paris in the second half of the 19th century. Marcel Proust, Franz Liszt, Richard Wagner, Pierre Loti, Anatole France, Claude Debussy and Charles Gounod were some of the well known European personalities who frequented the salon.

== Career ==
She was born Elena Costache-Epureanu in 1855 in Bârlad, at the time in the Principality of Moldavia, as daughter of Manolache Costache Epureanu, who later became Prime Minister of Romania and his wife, Princess Maria Sturdza. She married Alexandru Bibescu, with whom she had 3 children: Antoine, Emmanuel, and Hélène.

Elena Bibescu debuted as a pianist on February 14, 1873 in Bucharest, in a charity concert held at Grand Theatre of Bucharest, in the presence of King Carol I and Queen Elisabeth of Romania. Elena Bibescu was a protectress of George Enescu, alongside Queen Elisabeth, and promoted the Romanian musician among the French elite. In 1954, more than 5 decades after her death, Enescu dedicated to her memory the symphonic poem, Vox Maris.

She was a student of pianist and composer Anton Rubinstein at the prestigious Vienna Conservatory. Elena Bibescu graduated from the conservatory. She was awarded a medal and a diploma of honor.

After returning to Romania in October 1902 and residing in the family's manor in Epureni, a few kilometers away from Bârlad, Elena was transported to Iași after falling ill from cancer. She died shortly afterward on 18 October 1902.
