= Science and technology in Romania =

Science and technology are well developed in Romania, with the presence of several universities and research institutes, and have a distinguished tradition going back more than a century. Romania was ranked 49th in the Global Innovation Index in 2025.

== Aviation and aeronautics ==
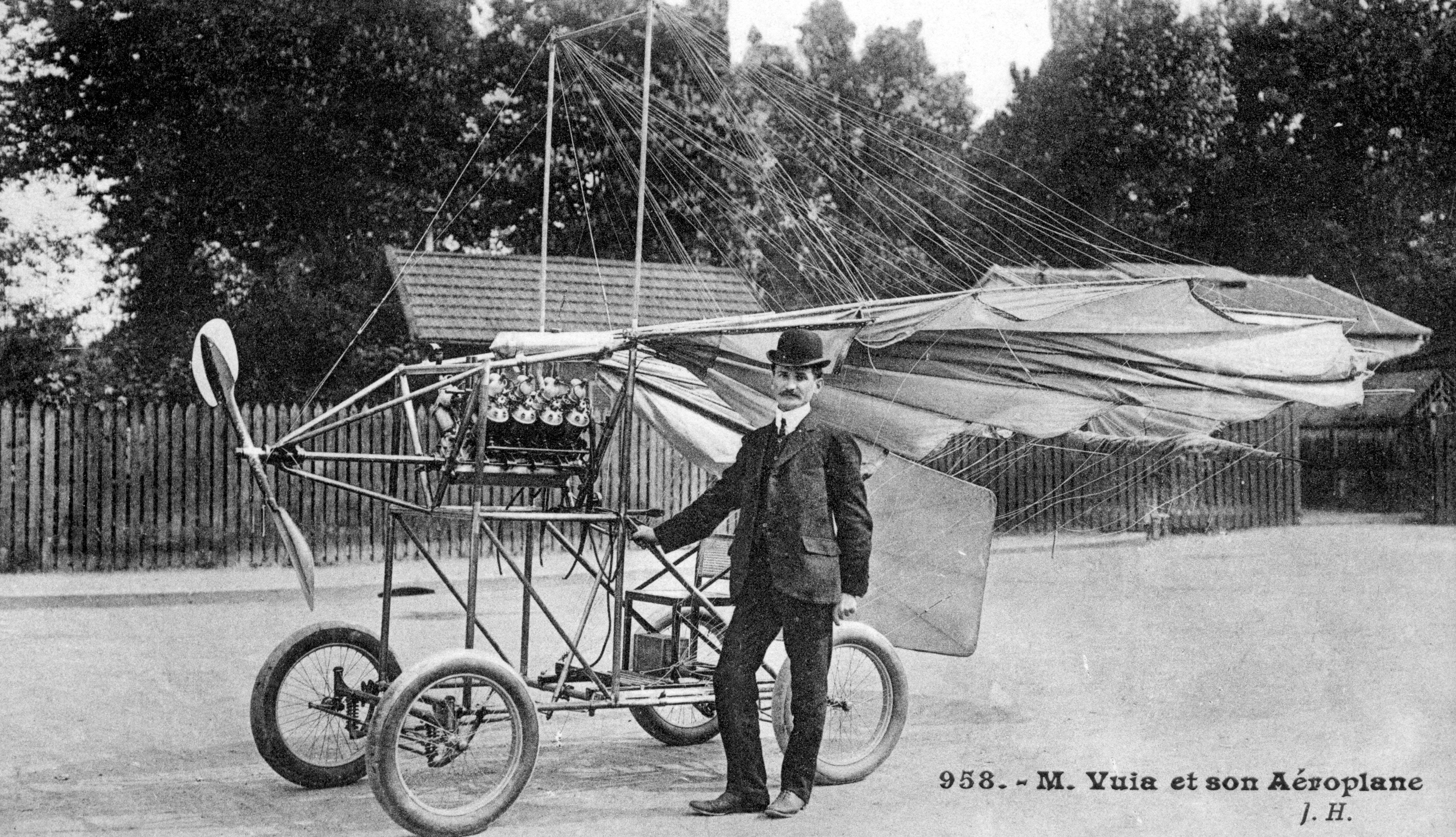
Traian Vuia 2

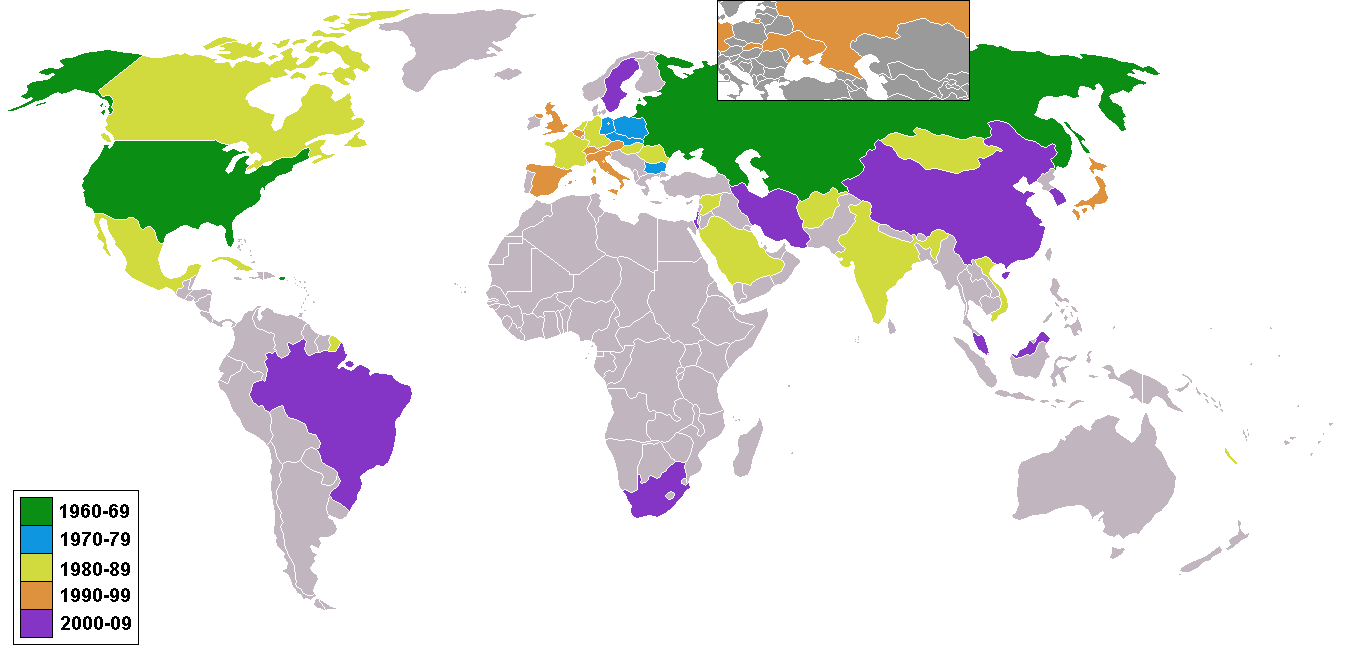
Countries whose citizens have flown in space as of 2006

On March 18, 1906 Traian Vuia achieved a short hop at a height of about 30 centimetres (1 ft). His flight was performed in Montesson near Paris and was about 12 metres (39 ft) long.

Henri Coandă was a Romanian inventor and pioneer of aviation. He exhibited the non-flying Coandă-1910 at the Second International Aeronautical Exhibition in Paris in October 1910, and built his first flying aircraft in 1911. He discovered the Coandă effect of fluidics, and was the first to recognize the practical application of the phenomenon in aircraft design.

On May 14, 1981, Romania became the 11th country in the world to have an astronaut in space. That astronaut, Dumitru Prunariu later served as president of the Romanian Space Agency.

== Biology, chemistry and medicine ==
George Emil Palade was a Romanian-born cell biologist who won the Nobel Prize in Physiology or Medicine in 1974 for his study of internal organization of such cell structures as mitochondria, chloroplasts, the Golgi apparatus, and for the discovery of the ribosomes. He also won the National Medal of Science in 1986.

George Constantinescu created the theory of sonics, while Lazăr Edeleanu was the first chemist to synthesize amphetamine and also invented the modern method of refining crude oil.

== Mathematics ==
Mathematics research in Romania started in the late 19th century and the early 20th century with the work of Spiru Haret, Traian Lalescu, Octav Mayer, Miron Nicolescu, Octav Onicescu, Dimitrie Pompeiu, Isaac Jacob Schoenberg, Simion Stoilow, Gheorghe Țițeica, and Gheorghe Vrănceanu.

In the second half of the 20th century, there was a tremendous increase of research activity and international visibility. A very strong school of operator algebras and C*-algebras developed around Ciprian Foias and Dan-Virgil Voiculescu (the initiator of the field of Free probability), whose tradition has continued with Sorin Popa, Adrian Ioana, Adrian Ocneanu, Florin Boca, and others. Research in algebra and algebraic geometry is represented in the works of mathematicians such as Nicolae Popescu (of Gabriel–Popescu theorem fame), Alexandru Dimca, Mircea Mustață, and Mihnea Popa, while research in number theory is represented by Florian Pop, Preda Mihăilescu (proof of Catalan's conjecture), Cristian Dumitru Popescu, Alexandru Zaharescu, and Alina Carmen Cojocaru.

Research in the fields of topology, symplectic geometry, global analysis, and geometric group theory has been pursued my mathematicians such as Tudor Ganea, Valentin Poénaru, Henri Moscovici, Tudor Ratiu, Eleny Ionel, Cornelia Druțu, and Ciprian Manolescu (known for his application of Seiberg–Witten Floer theory to the Hauptvermutung). Finally, strong research in mathematical analysis, complex analysis, partial differential equations, and numerical analysis appears in the works of Cabiria Andreian Cazacu, Sergiu Klainerman, Daniel Tătaru, Matei Machedon, Monica Vișan, and Ioana Dumitriu.

== Physics ==
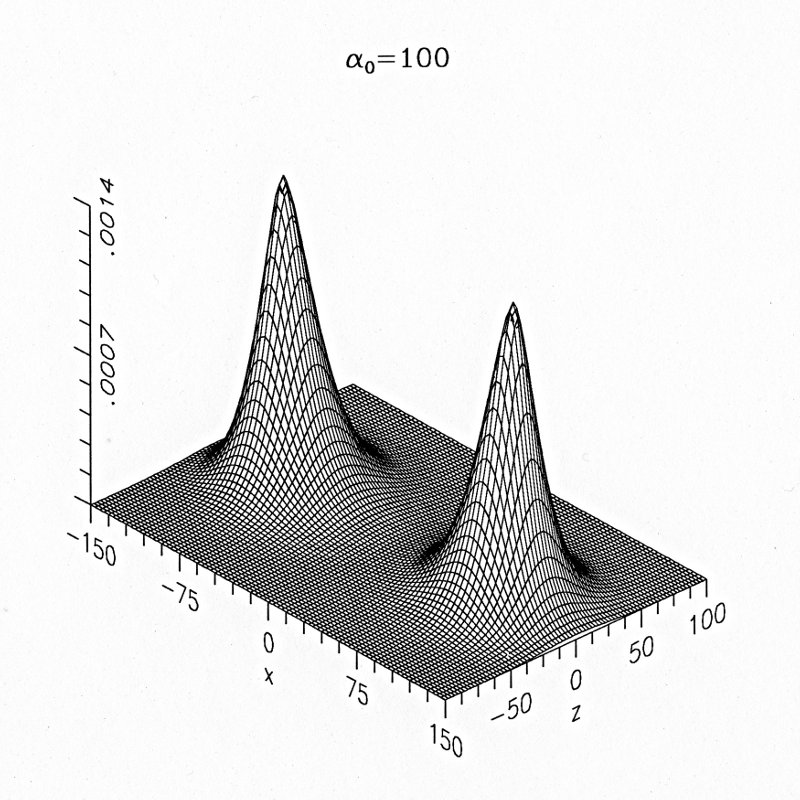
Atomic dichotomy – a phenomenon discovered by Mihai Gavrilă

Notable Romanian physicists and inventors also include: Horia Hulubei in atomic physics, Șerban Țițeica in theoretical physics, especially thermodynamics and statistical mechanics, Mihai Gavrilă in quantum theory, Alexandru Proca known for the first meson theory of nuclear forces and Proca's equations of the vectorial mesonic field, formulated independently of the pion theory of Nobel laureate Hideki Yukawa (who predicted the existence of the pion in 1947), Ştefan Procopiu known for the first theory of the magnetic moment of the electron in 1911 (now known as the Bohr-Procopiu magneton), Theodor V. Ionescu – the inventor of a multiple-cavity magnetron in 1935, a hydrogen maser in 1947, 3D imaging for cinema/television in 1924, quantum emission in hot plasmas and hot deuterium plasma beams for controlled nuclear fusion in 1969, Ionel Solomon known for the nuclear magnetic resonance theory in solids in 1955, the Solomon equations, solid state physics, semiconductors in 1979, and photovoltaics since 1988, Mircea Sabău and Florentina Mosora known for their contributions to nuclear medicine, Petrache Poenaru, Nicolae Teclu and Monica Guică.

== Computer science and technology ==
Mathematician Ştefan Odobleja has been claimed to be one of the precursors of cybernetics, while Grigore Moisil is viewed as the father of computer science in Romania. Another mathematician, Cristian S. Calude is known for his work on algorithmic information theory, while physicist Victor Toma is known for the invention and construction of the first Romanian computer, the CIFA-1 in 1955.

At the beginning of the third millennium, there was a boom in Romania in the number of computer programmers. Romania is reported to be among the countries with the highest number of computer programmers in the world. Some examples of successful software include RAV (Romanian AntiVirus) which was bought in 2003 by Microsoft for use in their development of Windows Defender, and BitDefender, which was considered the number one antivirus software and internet security software in a report from TopTenReviews.

== See also ==
- ARCAspace
- Aviation in Romania
- List of universities in Romania
- List of research institutes in Romania
- Nuclear power in Romania
- Romanian Academy
- Romanian Academy of Sciences
