= Dan Burghelea =

Romanian-American mathematician

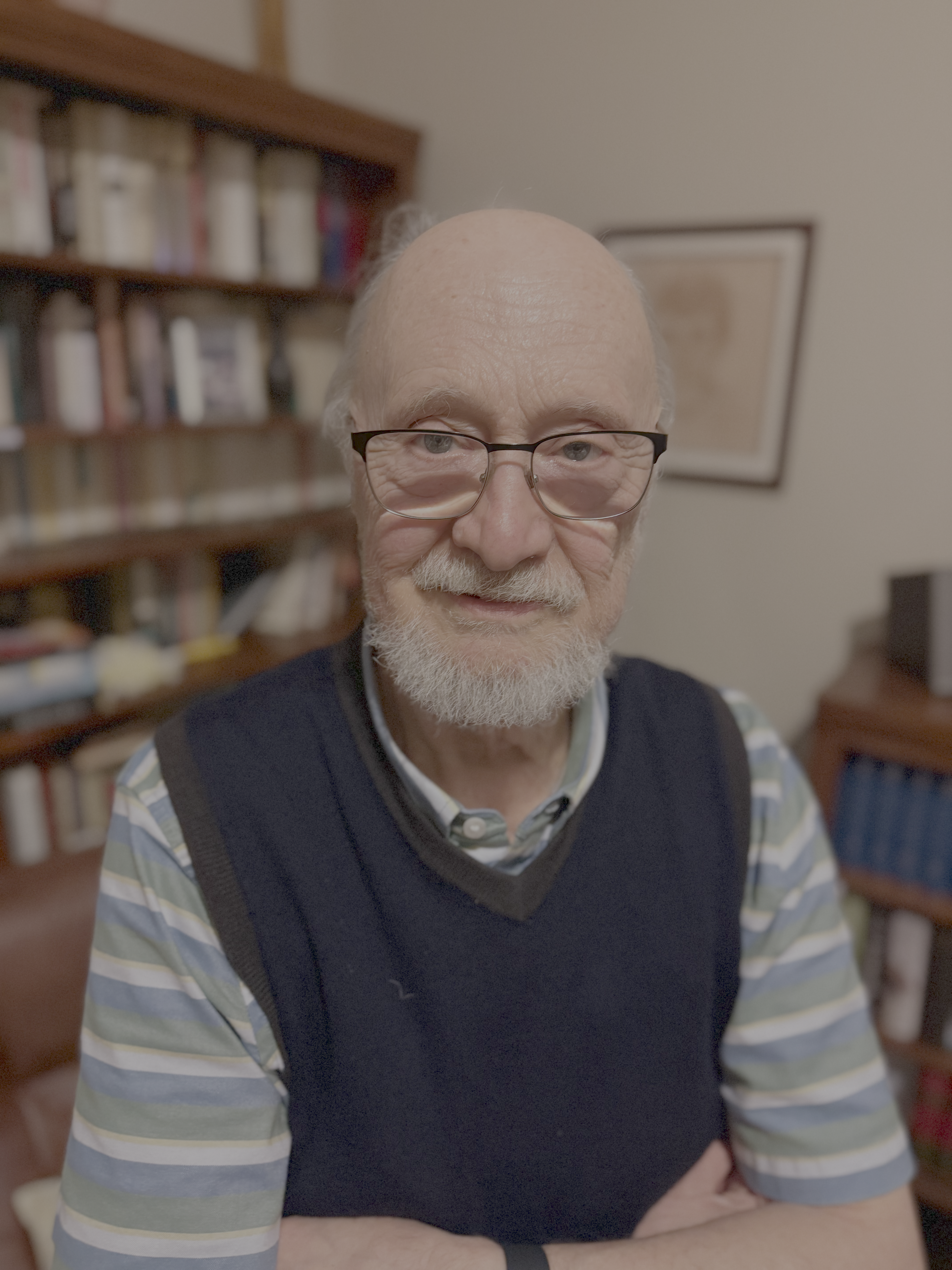
- Dan Burghelea, 2025
- Born: July 30, 1943 (age 83); Râmnicu Vâlcea, Kingdom of Romania
- Occupations: Mathematician, academic and researcher
- Spouse: Ana Burghelea (m. 1965)
- Children: 1
- Awards: Doctor Honoris-Causa, West University of Timișoara; National Order of Faithful Service; Distinction Academic Merit, Romanian Academy of Sciences; Medal of Honor, Romanian Mathematical Society

Academic background
- Education: University of Bucharest; Institute of Mathematics of the Romanian Academy
- Thesis: Hilbert manifolds (1968)
- Doctoral advisor: Miron Nicolescu

Dan Burghelea (born July 30, 1943) is a Romanian-American mathematician, academic, and researcher. He is an Emeritus Professor of Mathematics at Ohio State University.

Burghelea has contributed to a number of mathematical domains such as geometric and algebraic topology (including differential topology, algebraic K-theory, cyclic homology), global and geometric analysis (including topology of infinite dimensional manifolds, spectral geometry, dynamical systems), and applied topology (including computational topology).

== Early life and education ==
Burghelea was born in Râmnicu Vâlcea, Romania, in 1943, where he attended Alexandru Lahovari National College (at that time lyceum Nicolae Bălcescu). He attended the University of Bucharest and graduated in mathematics in 1965, with a diploma-thesis in algebraic topology. He obtained his Ph.D. in 1968 from the Institute of Mathematics of the Romanian Academy (IMAR) with a thesis on Hilbert manifolds.

In 1972, Burghelea was awarded the title of Doctor Docent in sciences by the University of Bucharest, making him the youngest recipient of the highest academic degree in Romania.

== Career ==
After a brief military service, Burghelea started his career in 1966 as a junior researcher at IMAR. He was promoted to Researcher in 1968, and to Senior Researcher in 1970. After the dissolution of IMAR, he was employed by the Institute of Nuclear Physics (IFA-Bucharest) and National Institute for Scientific Creation (INCREST) from 1975 until 1977. Burghelea left Romania for the United States in 1977, and in 1979 he joined the Ohio State University as a professor of mathematics. He retired in 2015, and remains associated with this university as an Emeritus Professor.

During his career he has been a visiting professor at numerous universities from Europe and the United States, including the University of Paris, the University of Bonn, ETH Zurich, the University of Chicago, and research institutions including the Institute for Advanced Study, Institut des Hautes Études Scientifiques, Max Planck Institute for Mathematics, Mathematical Sciences Research Institute; and invited speaker to many conferences in Europe, North and South America, and Asia and organized/co-organized workshops and conferences in Topology and Applications in Europe and the United States. He has significantly influenced the orientation of the geometry-topology research in Romania.

== Research ==
Burghelea has worked in algebraic, differential, geometrical topology, differential and complex geometry, commutative algebra, global and geometric analysis, and applied topology.

His most significant contributions are on Topology of infinite dimensional manifolds; Homotopy type of the space of homeomorphisms and diffeomorphisms of compact smooth manifolds; Algebraic K-theory and cyclic homology of topological spaces, groups (including simplicial groups) and commutative algebras (including differential graded commutative algebras); Zeta-regularized determinants of elliptic operators and implications to torsion invariants for Riemannian manifolds.

Burghelea has also proposed and studied a computer friendly alternative to Morse–Novikov theory which makes the results of Morse–Novikov theory a powerful tool in topology, applicable outside topology in situations of interest in fields like physics and data analysis. He was the first to generate concepts of semisimple degree of symmetry and BFK-gluing formula.

He has authored several books including Groups of Automorphisms of Manifolds and New Topological Invariants for Real- and Angle-valued Maps: An Alternative to Morse-Novikov Theory.

He has advised several Ph.D. students.

== Awards and honors ==
- 1966 – Simion Stoilow Prize, the Romanian Academy
- 1995 – Doctor Honoris-Causa, West University of Timișoara
- 2003 – National Order of Faithful Service, Commander rank
- 2005 – Honorary membership, IMAR, Romania
- 2009 – Distinction Academic Merit, Romanian Academy of Sciences
- 2019 – Medal of Honor, the Romanian Mathematical Society

== Personal life ==
Dan Burghelea married Ana Burghelea, in 1965. They have a daughter, Gabriela Tomescu.

== Bibliography ==
Burghelea's books include:

- Antonelli, Peter L.; Burghelea, Dan; Kahn, Peter J. (1971). The Concordance-Homotopy Groups of Geometric Automorphism Groups. Lecture Notes in Mathematics. Vol. 215. Berlin, New York: Springer-Verlag. doi:10.1007/BFb0061176. ISBN 978-0387055602. MR 0358834.
- Burghelea, Dan; Hangan, Theodor; Moscovici, Henri; Verona, Andrei (1973). Introducere în topologia diferențială (in Romanian). București: Editura științifică. OCLC 22096344.
- Burghelea, Dan; Lashof, Richard; Rothenberg, Melvin (1975). Groups of Automorphisms of Manifolds. Lecture Notes in Mathematics. Vol. 473. Berlin, New York: Springer-Verlag. doi:10.1007/bfb0079981. ISBN 978-3-540-07182-2. MR 0380841. OCLC 1527692.
- Burghelea, Dan (2017). New topological invariants for real- and angle-valued maps: an alternative to Morse–Novikov theory. Hackensack, NJ: World Scientific. doi:10.1142/9254. ISBN 978-9814618267. MR 3645481.
