= Alexandru Dimca =

Romanian mathematician

Alexandru Dimca (born July 21, 1953) is a French-Romanian mathematician, who works in algebraic geometry at Université Nice-Sophia-Antipolis.

== Education and career ==
Dimca was born in Cernavodă on 21 July 1953. He competed in the International Mathematical Olympiad in 1970, 1971, and 1972, earning one bronze medal and two silver medals. He obtained his PhD in 1981 from the University of Bucharest; his thesis "Stable mappings and singularities", was written under the direction of Gheorghe Galbură.

Among his influential professors we mention Dan Burghelea, Martin Jurchescu, Constantin Bănica, and Lucian Bădescu. Dimca's Google Scholar h-index is 38.

Dimca is a distinguished mathematician working in various aspects of algebra, geometry, and topology. He has written four important books in this field: Hyperplane Arrangements, Sheaves in Topology, Singularities and Topology of Hypersurfaces, and Topics on real and complex singularities as well as more than 180 journal papers.

Dimca started his research career in Romania, where he worked at the Institute of Mathematics of the Romanian Academy from 1979 to 1988. He then was a visiting member at the Max Planck Institute for Mathematics in Bonn and the Institute for Advanced Study in Princeton, New Jersey. After working as Senior Lecturer at the University of Sydney from 1991 to 1994, he became a professor at the University of Bordeaux, from where he moved in 2004 to Côte d'Azur University in Nice.

== Honors ==
- 2005 – Honorary membership, IMAR, Romania
- Doctor Honoris Causa from Ovidius University in 2007.
- Senior Member of Institut Universitaire de France from 2011 to 2016.

== Personal life ==
Alexandru Dimca is married to Gabriela and has three children, Jean, Georges and Maria.

== Books ==
- Dimca, Alexandru (2017). Hyperplane Arrangements. ISBN 978-3-319-56220-9. MR 3618796.
- Dimca, Alexandru (2004). Sheaves in Topology. ISBN 978-3-642-18868-8. MR 2050072.
- Dimca, Alexandru (1992). Singularities and Topology of Hypersurfaces. ISBN 978-0387977096. MR 1194180.
- Dimca, Alexandru (1987). Topics on real and complex singularities. ISBN 3528089997. MR 1013785. OL 18582323M.

== Main articles ==
- Alexandru Dimca (1984). "Are the isolated singularities of complete intersections determined by their singular subspaces?". Mathematische Annalen. 267 (4): 461–472. doi:10.1007/BF01455964. MR 0742892.
- Alexandru Dimca (1990). "Betti numbers of hypersurfaces and defects of linear systems". Duke Mathematical Journal. 60 (1): 285–298. doi:10.1215/S0012-7094-90-06010-7. MR 1047124.
- Pierre Deligne; Alexandru Dimca (1990). "Filtrations de Hodge et par l'ordre du pôle pour les hypersurfaces singulières" (PDF). Annales scientifiques de l'École Normale Supérieure. 23 (4): 645–656. doi:10.24033/asens.1616. MR 1072821.
- Alexandru Dimca; Ștefan Papadima (2003). "Hypersurface complements, Milnor fibers and higher homotopy groups of arrangements". Annals of Mathematics. 158 (2): 473–507. doi:10.4007/annals.2003.158.473. MR 2018927.
- Alexandru Dimca; Morihiko Saito (2006). "A generalization of Griffiths' theorem on rational integrals". Duke Mathematical Journal. 135 (2): 303–326. doi:10.1215/S0012-7094-06-13523-8. MR 2267285.
- Alexandru Dimca; Alexander I. Suciu (2009). "Which 3-manifolds groups are Kähler groups?". Journal of the European Mathematical Society. 11 (3): 521–528. arXiv:0709.4350. doi:10.4171/JEMS/158. MR 2505439.
- Alexandru Dimca; Ștefan Papadima; Alexander I. Suciu (2009). "Topology and geometry of cohomology jump loci". Duke Mathematical Journal. 148 (3): 405–457. arXiv:0902.1250. doi:10.1215/00127094-2009-030. MR 2527322.
- Alexandru Dimca (2019). "On rational cuspidal plane curves and the local cohomology of Jacobian rings". Commentarii Mathematici Helvetici. 94 (4): 689–700. doi:10.4171/cmh/471. MR 4046002.
- Alexandru Dimca; Piotr Pokora (2023). "Maximizing curves viewed as free curves". International Mathematics Research Notices. 22: 19156–19183. arXiv:2208.13399. doi:10.1093/imrn/rnad042. MR 4669798.
- Alexandru Dimca; Gabriel Sticlaru (2025). "Waring ranks of sextic binary forms via geometric invariant theory". Transformation Groups. 30 (1): 187–201. arXiv:2105.12016. doi:10.1007/s00031-022-09774-0. MR 4863960.
