= Burghelea =

Burghelea or Burghele is a surname. Notable people with the surname include:

- Dan Burghelea (b. 1943), Romanian-American mathematician, academic, and researcher
- Theodor Burghele (1905–1977), Romanian surgeon and urologist, President of the Romanian Academy, and Minister of Health.

== See also ==
- Burghelea, a village in Ișcălău Commune, Fălești District, Moldova
