= Cabiria Andreian Cazacu =

Romanian mathematician (1928–2018)

- Born: 19 February 1928; Iași, Kingdom of Romania
- Died: 22 May 2018 (aged 90); Bucharest, Romania
- Resting place: Ghencea Cemetery, Bucharest
- Education: University of Bucharest
- Awards: Simion Stoilow Prize; National Order of Faithful Service, Commander rank Honorary member of the Romanian Academy
- Scientific career
- Fields: Mathematics
- Workplaces: University of Bucharest; Institute of Mathematics of the Romanian Academy
- Thesis: Normally exhaustible Riemann surfaces (1955)
- Doctoral advisor: Simion Stoilow

Cabiria Andreian Cazacu (February 19, 1928 – May 22, 2018) was a Romanian mathematician known for her work in complex analysis. She held the chair in mathematical analysis at the University of Bucharest from 1973 to 1975, and was dean of the faculty of mathematics at the University of Bucharest from 1976 to 1984.

== Life ==
Andreian Cazacu was born on February 19, 1928, in Iași, the daughter of mathematics teacher Ioan T. Ardeleanu. Towards the end of World War II, her family became refugees in Bucharest, where she completed her high school studies in 1945. She then enrolled in the Faculty of Mathematics at the University of Bucharest, graduating with a B.S. in 1949; her undergraduate thesis, on Generalized nilpotent groups, was written under the guidance of Dan Barbilian. She then continued at the university, first as a teaching assistant and then as a lecturer starting in 1950. She became a student of Simion Stoilow, completing a doctorate in 1955 under his supervision, with the dissertation Normally exhaustible Riemann surfaces. After being named associate professor in 1955, she completed a habilitation in 1967, with the habilitation thesis Classes of Riemann coverings, and was promoted to full professor in 1968.

From 1951 to 1969 Andreian Cazacu held a research position at the Institute of Mathematics of the Romanian Academy, where she was a leading participant in Stoilow's seminar on complex analysis. She held visiting positions at the Free University of Berlin, Université libre de Bruxelles, the University of Helsinki, the University of Łódź, and Université de Moncton.

Between 1976 and 2010 she supervised the Ph.D. theses of 15 students. Andreian Cazacu was one of the main organizers of eleven editions of the Romanian-Finnish Seminar on complex analysis and potential theory, founded by Rolf Nevanlinna and Stoilow; the proceedings of four of these seminars, for which she was an editor, appeared in the Springer Lecture Notes in Mathematics series as four separate volumes.

She died on May 22, 2018, in Bucharest and was buried at Ghencea Cemetery.

== Publications ==
Andreian Cazacu wrote "approximately 100 scientific papers and six books". The books include:

- Andreian Cazacu, Cabiria; Constantinescu, Corneliu; Jurchescu, Martin (1965). Probleme moderne de teoria funcțiilor [Modern problems of the theory of functions] (in Romanian). Bucharest: Editura Academiei Republicii Populare Române. MR 0200105. OCLC 6014733.
- Andreian Cazacu, Cabiria; Deleanu, Aristide; Jurchescu, Martin (1966). Topologie, categorii, suprafețe riemanniene [Topology, categories, Riemann surfaces] (in Romanian). Bucharest: Editura Academiei Republicii Populare Române. MR 0215663. OCLC 4666024.
- Andreian Cazacu, Cabiria (1975). Theorie der Funktionen mehrerer komplexer Veränderlicher [Theory of functions of several complex variables]. Lehrbücher und Monographien aus dem Gebiet der Exakten Wissenschaften, Mathematische Reihe (in German). Vol. 51. Basel-Stuttgart: Birkhäuser. ISBN 3-7643-0770-6. MR 0473209. OCLC 2090281.

== Recognition ==
Andreian Cazacu won the Simion Stoilow Prize of the Romanian Academy in 1966. In 1998 the University of Craiova gave her an honorary doctorate. She was awarded in 2000 the National Order of Faithful Service, Officer rank by President Ion Iliescu, while in 2011 she was awarded the National Order of Faithful Service, Commander rank by President Traian Băsescu. She became an honorary member of the Romanian Academy in 2006. In 2010, the journal Complex Variables and Elliptic Equations published a special issue in honor of her 80th birthday.
