= Henri Moscovici =

Romanian American mathematician

Henri Moscovici (born 5 May 1944) is a Romanian-American mathematician, specializing in non-commutative geometry and global analysis.

Moscovici received his undergraduate degree in 1966 and his doctorate in 1971 at the University of Bucharest under the supervision of Gheorghe Vrânceanu. From 1966 to 1971 Moscovici was an assistant at Politehnica University of Bucharest, from 1971 to 1975 at the Institute of Mathematics of the Romanian Academy and from 1975 to 1977 at the Institute of Atomic Physics in Măgurele, and from 1977 at the INCREST in Bucharest. In 1978 he left for the United States, where he was a visitor at the Institute for Advanced Study in Princeton, New Jersey. In 1980 he joined the Ohio State University, where he held the Alice Wood Chair in Mathematics; he is now a Professor Emeritus there.

Moscovici does research on representation theory, global analysis, and non-commutative geometry, in which he has collaborated with, among others, Alain Connes, since the two met at the Institute for Advanced Study in 1978. With Connes he proved in 1990 a refinement of the Atiyah–Singer index theorem. As recounted by Connes in a 2021 interview, Moscovici became his greatest collaborator.

In 1990 he was Invited Speaker with talk Cyclic cohomology and invariants of multiply connected manifold at the International Congress of Mathematicians in Kyoto. He has advised 14 Ph.D. students, including András Némethi.

In 2001, he received the Ohio State University Distinguished Scholar Award. In 1995 he was a Guggenheim Fellow. From 1999 to 2000 he was at Harvard University as a scholar of the Clay Mathematics Institute. In 2003, he was awarded the Romanian National Order of Faithful Service, Commander rank. A conference in his honor was held at the Hausdorff Center for Mathematics in Bonn in 2009. He was elected a Fellow of the American Mathematical Society in 2012.

== Selected publications ==
- Connes, Alain; Moscovici, Henri (1982). "The L^{2}-Index Theorem for homogeneous spaces of Lie groups". Annals of Mathematics. 115 (2): 291. doi:10.2307/1971393. JSTOR 1971393.
- Barbasch, Dan; Moscovici, Henri (1983). "L^{2}-index and the Selberg trace formula". Journal of Functional Analysis. 53 (2): 151–201. doi:10.1016/0022-1236(83)90050-2. (See Selberg trace formula.)
- Connes, Alain; Moscovici, Henri (1990). "Cyclic cohomology, the Novikov conjecture and hyperbolic groups". Topology. 29 (3): 345–388. doi:10.1016/0040-9383(90)90003-3. (See Novikov conjecture.)
- Connes, Alain; Gromov, Mikhael; Moscovici, Henri (1993). "Group cohomology with Lipschitz control and higher signatures". Geometric and Functional Analysis. 3 (1): 1–78. doi:10.1007/BF01895513. MR 1204787. S2CID 15060588.
- Connes, Alain; Moscovici, Henri (1995). "The local index formula in noncommutative geometry". Geometric and Functional Analysis. 5 (2): 174–243. doi:10.1007/BF01895667. MR 1334867. (also at doi:10.1007/978-3-0348-9102-8_4)
- Connes, Alain; Moscovici, Henri (1998). "Hopf Algebras, Cyclic Cohomology and the Transverse Index Theorem". Communications in Mathematical Physics. 198 (1): 199–246. arXiv:math/9806109. Bibcode:1998CMaPh.198..199C. doi:10.1007/s002200050477. S2CID 15238820.
- Connes, Alain; Moscovici, Henri (1999). "Cyclic Cohomology and Hopf Algebras". Letters in Mathematical Physics. 48: 97–108. arXiv:math/9904154. doi:10.1023/A:1007527510226. S2CID 117855160. (See Hopf algebra.)
- Connes, Alain; Moscovici, Henri (2000). "Cyclic Cohomology and Hopf Algebra Symmetry". Letters in Mathematical Physics. 52: 1–28. doi:10.1023/A:1007698216597. S2CID 117908037.
- Connes, Alain; Moscovici, Henri (2004). "Rankin-Cohen brackets and the Hopf algebra of transverse geometry". Moscow Mathematical Journal. 4 (1): 111–130. arXiv:math/0304316. doi:10.17323/1609-4514-2004-4-1-111-130. S2CID 3001698. (See Rankin–Cohen bracket.)
- Connes, Alain; Moscovici, Henri (2008), "Type III and spectral triples", Traces in number theory, geometry and quantum fields, Aspects of Mathematics, vol. E38, Wiesbaden: Friedr. Vieweg, pp. 57–71, arXiv:math/0609703, MR 2427588
- Connes, Alain; Moscovici, Henri (2014). "Modular curvature for noncommutative two-tori". Journal of the American Mathematical Society. 27 (3): 639–684. arXiv:1110.3500. doi:10.1090/S0894-0347-2014-00793-1. MR 3194491. S2CID 1517221.
