= Miron Nicolescu =

Romanian mathematician (1903–1975)

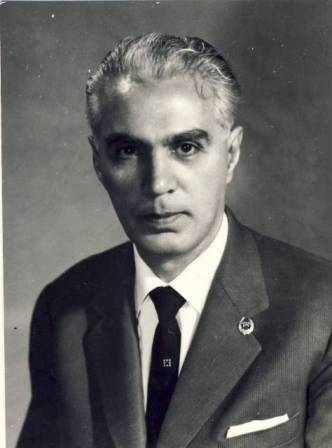
- Born: August 27, 1903; Giurgiu, Kingdom of Romania
- Died: June 30, 1975 (aged 71); Bucharest, Socialist Republic of Romania
- Education: University of Bucharest; École Normale Supérieure; Sorbonne
- Known for: President of the Romanian Academy
- Awards: Legion of Honour
- Scientific career
- Fields: Mathematics
- Workplaces: University of Cernăuți; University of Bucharest; Institute of Mathematics of the Romanian Academy
- Thesis: Fonctions complexes dans le plan et dans l'espace (1928)
- Doctoral advisor: Paul Montel
- Doctoral students: Ciprian Foias; Solomon Marcus; Nicolae Popescu; Dan Burghelea

Miron Nicolescu (Romanian: [miˈron nikoˈlesku]; August 27, 1903 – June 30, 1975) was a Romanian mathematician, best known for his work in real analysis and differential equations. He was president of the Romanian Academy and vice-president of the International Mathematical Union.

Born in Giurgiu, the son of a teacher, he attended the Matei Basarab High School in Bucharest. After completing his undergraduate studies at the Faculty of Mathematics of the University of Bucharest in 1924, he went to Paris, where he enrolled at the École Normale Supérieure and the Sorbonne. In 1928, he completed his doctoral dissertation, Fonctions complexes dans le plan et dans l'espace, under the direction of Paul Montel. Upon returning to Romania, he taught at the University of Cernăuți until 1940, when he was named professor at the University of Bucharest.

In 1936, he was elected an associate member of the Romanian Academy, and, in 1953, full member. After King Michael's Coup of August 23, 1944, Nicolescu joined the Social Democratic Party, and later became a member of the Romanian Communist Party. In 1963, he became director of the Institute of Mathematics of the Romanian Academy, a position he held until 1973. From 1966 until his death, he served as president of the Romanian Academy. Peter Freund (who met Nicolescu when he gave a lecture in Timișoara), described him as an "affable, debonair man, and a very handsome ladies' man."

Nicolescu was awarded the Legion of Honour, Commander rank, and was elected in 1972 member of the German National Academy of Sciences Leopoldina. At the International Congress of Mathematicians held in Vancouver, British Columbia, Canada in 1974, he was elected vice-president of the International Mathematical Union, a position he held from 1975 until his death (his term was completed by Gheorghe Vrănceanu).

A technical high school in Sector 4 of Bucharest bears his name, and so does a boulevard in Giurgiu.

== Publications ==
- Nicolesco, Miron (1935). "Recherches sur les fonctions polyharmoniques". Annales Scientifiques de l'École Normale Supérieure. 3e série (in French). 52: 183–220. doi:10.24033/asens.848.
- Nicolescu, Miron (1992). Opera matematică. Ecuații eliptice și parabolice (in Romanian). With a preface by Solomon Marcus. București: Editura Academiei Republicii Socialiste România. ISBN 973-27-0312-1. MR 1254660. OCLC 7248296.
- Nicolescu, Miron (1995). Opera matematică. Analiză reală (in Romanian). With a preface by Solomon Marcus. București: Editura Academiei Republicii Socialiste România. ISBN 973-27-0523-X. MR 1473972. OCLC 758797290.

== See also ==
- Heat equation
