= Alexandru Zaharescu =

Romanian-American mathematician

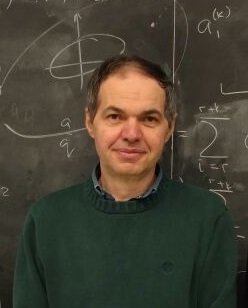
- Born: 4 June 1961; Codlea, Brașov Region, Romanian People's Republic
- Citizenship: Romanian
- Education: University of Bucharest; Princeton University
- Scientific career
- Fields: Mathematics, Number theory
- Workplaces: University of Illinois at Urbana–Champaign; Institute of Mathematics of the Romanian Academy
- Doctoral advisors: Nicolae Popescu; Peter Sarnak
- Doctoral students: Alexander Dunn

Alexandru Zaharescu (born June 4, 1961) is a Romanian mathematician. He is a professor in the Department of Mathematics, University of Illinois at Urbana–Champaign, and an Honorary Member at the Institute of Mathematics of the Romanian Academy. He has two PhDs in mathematics, one from the University of Bucharest in 1991 under the direction of Nicolae Popescu, the other from Princeton University in 1995 under the direction of Peter Sarnak. Zaharescu made numerous contributions to number theory. In total, he has more than 400 publications.

== Early life ==
Zaharescu was born on June 4, 1961, and grew up in Codlea, Romania. He graduated from high school in Codlea in 1980, and from the University of Bucharest in 1986. He joined the Institute of Mathematics of the Romanian Academy in 1989, and in 1991 he received a PhD from the University of Bucharest.

== Career ==
Zaharescu received his second PhD from Princeton University in 1995. After that, he held temporary positions at the Massachusetts Institute of Technology, McGill University, the Institute for Advanced Study, before joining the faculty at the University of Illinois in 2000.

== Awards and honours ==
Zaharescu was elected a Fellow of the American Mathematical Society in 2017, for contributions to analytic number theory. A conference in honor of his 60th birthday was held in June 2021 at the Institute of Mathematics of the Romanian Academy. In March 2024, he was elected Honorary Member of the Romanian Academy.
