= Simion Stoilow Prize =

Romanian mathematics prize

The Simion Stoilow Prize (Romanian: Premiul Simion Stoilow) is the prize offered by the Romanian Academy for achievements in mathematics. It is named in honor of Simion Stoilow.

The prize is awarded either for a mathematical work or for a cycle of works. The award consists of 2,000 lei and a diploma. The prize was established in 1963 and is awarded annually. Prizes of the Romanian Academy for a particular year are awarded two years later.

== Honorees ==
Honorees of the Simion Stoilow Prize have included:

- 2020: Victor Daniel Lie
- 2019: Marius Ghergu; Bogdan Teodor Udrea
- 2018: Iulian Cîmpean
- 2017: Aurel Mihai Fulger
- 2016: Arghir Dani Zărnescu
- 2015: No award
- 2014: Florin Ambro
- 2013: Petru Jebelean
- 2012: George Marinescu
- 2011: Dan Timotin
- 2010: Laurențiu Leuștean; Mihai Mihăilescu
- 2009: Miodrag Iovanov; Sebastian Burciu
- 2008: Nicolae Bonciocat; Călin Ambrozie
- 2007: Cezar Joița; Bebe Prunaru; Liviu Ignat
- 2006: Radu Pantilie
- 2005: Eugen Mihăilescu, for the work "Estimates for the stable dimension for holomorphic maps"; Radu Păltânea, for the cycle of works "Approximation theory using positive linear operators"
- 2000: Liliana Pavel, for the book Hipergrupuri ("Hypergroups")
- 1999: Vicențiu Rădulescu for the work "Boundary value problems for nonlinear elliptic equations and hemivariational inequalities"
- 1995: No award
- 1994: No award
- 1993: No award
- 1992: Florin Rădulescu
- 1991: Ovidiu Cârjă
- 1990: Ștefan Mirică
- 1989: Gelu Popescu
- 1988: Cornel Pasnicu
- 1987: Călin-Ioan Gheorghiu; Titus Petrila
- 1986: Vlad Bally; Paltin Ionescu
- 1985: Vasile Brânzănescu; Paul Flondor; Dan Polisevschi; Mihai Putinar
- 1984: Toma Albu; Mihnea Colțoiu; Dan Vuza
- 1983: Mircea Puta; Ion Chițescu; Eugen Popa
- 1982: Mircea Craioveanu; Mircea Puta
- 1981: Lucian Bădescu
- 1980: Dumitru Gașpar; Costel Peligrad; Mihai Pimsner; Sorin T. Popa
- 1979: Dumitru Motreanu; Dorin Popescu; Ilie Valusescu
- 1978: Aurel Bejancu; Gheorghe Micula
- 1977: Alexandru Brezuleanu; Nicolae Radu; Ion Văduva
- 1976: Zoia Ceaușescu; Ion Cuculescu; Nicolae Popa
- 1975: Șerban Strătilă; Elena Stroescu; László Zsidó
- 1974: Ioana Ciorănescu; Dan Pascali; Constantin Vârsan
- 1973: Vasile Istrătescu; Ioan Marusciac; Constantin Năstăsescu; Veniamin Urseanu
- 1972: Bernard Bereanu; Nicolae Pavel; Gustav Peeters; Elena Moldovan Popoviciu
- 1971: Nicolae Popescu
- 1970: Viorel Barbu; Dorin Ieșan
- 1969: Ion Suciu
- 1968: Petru Caraman
- 1967: Constantin Apostol
- 1966: Dan Burghelea; Cabiria Andreian Cazacu; Aristide Deleanu
- 1965: Nicu Boboc; Alexandru Lascu
- 1964: Nicolae Dinculeanu; Ivan Singer
- 1963: Lazăr Dragoș; Martin Jurchescu

== See also ==
- List of mathematics awards
