= Alexander Dunn (mathematician) =

Australian mathematician

Alexander Jason Dunn is an Australian mathematician who works in analytic number theory. He has been an assistant professor at the Georgia Institute of Technology since 2023. Previously, he was a postdoc at the California Institute of Technology for three years, mentored by Maksym Radziwill.

Dunn received his doctorate degree in 2020 from the University of Illinois Urbana-Champaign under the supervision of Scott Ahlgren and Alexandru Zaharescu. In 2024, he won the SASTRA Ramanujan Prize in mathematics, citing his "several breakthroughs in the study of modular forms, half-integral weight forms, metaplectic forms and their connections to prime numbers and integer partitions."
