= Mircea Puta =

Romanian mathematician (1950–2007)

Mircea Puta (February 1, 1950 —July 26, 2007) was a Romanian mathematician, the 1983 recipient of the Simion Stoilow Prize of the Romanian Academy. He is the author of over 190 articles and two books.

Puta started his undergraduate studies at West University of Timișoara in 1969, graduating in 1974. He earned his Ph.D. degree in 1979, under the supervision of Dan Papuc, after which he joined the faculty at his alma mater, becoming a Professor in 1993.

== Bibliography ==
- Puta, Mircea (1993). Hamiltonian Mechanical Systems and Geometric Quantization. Mathematics and its Applications. Vol. 260. Dordrecht: Kluwer Academic Publishers Group. doi:10.1007/978-94-011-1992-4. ISBN 0-7923-2306-8. MR 1247960.
- Craioveanu, Mircea; Puta, Mircea; Rassias, Themistocles M. (2001). Old and new aspects in spectral geometry. Mathematics and its Applications. Vol. 534. Dordrecht: Kluwer Academic Publishers. doi:10.1007/978-94-017-2475-3. ISBN 1-4020-0052-9. MR 1880186. OCLC 47893050.
- Birtea, Petre; Puta, Mircea; Ratiu, Tudor S.; Tudoran, Răzvan (2005). "Symmetry breaking for toral actions in simple mechanical systems". Journal of Differential Equations. 216 (2): 282–323. arXiv:math/0311451. Bibcode:2005JDE...216..282B. doi:10.1016/j.jde.2005.06.003. MR 2162338. S2CID 16695256.
- Birtea, Petre; Puta, Mircea; Tudoran, Răzvan Micu (2007). "Periodic orbits in the case of a zero eigenvalue". Comptes Rendus Mathematique. 344 (12): 779–784. arXiv:0705.2361. doi:10.1016/j.crma.2007.05.003. MR 2340447. S2CID 115165829.
