= Ciprian Foias =

Romanian mathematician (1933–2020)

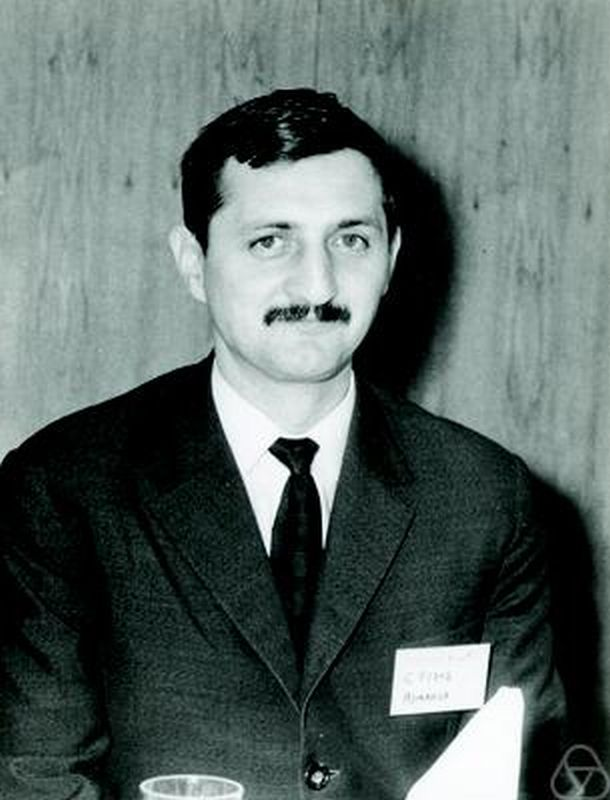
- Ciprian Foias in Tokyo 1969
- Born: Ciprian Ilie Foiaș; 20 July 1933; Reșița, Caraș County, Kingdom of Romania
- Died: 22 March 2020 (aged 86); Tempe, Arizona, United States of America
- Education: University of Bucharest; Institute of Mathematics of the Romanian Academy
- Known for: Commutant lifting theorem Foias constant
- Awards: Wiener Prize (1995)
- Scientific career
- Fields: Mathematics
- Workplaces: University of Bucharest; Institute of Mathematics of the Romanian Academy; Paris-Sud University; Indiana University; Texas A&M University
- Doctoral advisor: Miron Nicolescu
- Doctoral students: Zoia Ceaușescu; Adrian Ocneanu; Dan-Virgil Voiculescu

Ciprian Ilie Foiaș (20 July 1933 – 22 March 2020) was a Romanian-American mathematician. He was awarded the Norbert Wiener Prize in Applied Mathematics in 1995, for his contributions in operator theory.

== Education and career ==
Born in Reșița, Romania, Foiaș studied mathematics at the University of Bucharest. He completed his dissertation in 1957, but was not allowed to defend his thesis by the Communist government until 1962 because his father, a respected physician, had been sent to a forced labor camp after the communists came to power. He received his doctorate in 1962 from the Institute of Mathematics of the Romanian Academy (IMAR) under supervision of Miron Nicolescu.

Foias began teaching at the University of Bucharest in 1954. From 1958 to 1978 he was a researcher at IMAR, and from 1966 to 1978 he was a professor in the Faculty of Mathematics at the University of Bucharest. In recognition of his growing international reputation, he was named doctor docent in 1968.

Foias was an invited speaker at the International Congress of Mathematicians (ICM) in Nice in 1970, and again at the ICM in Helsinki in 1978. Following his lecture in Helsinki, he defected to France, and then taught at the University of Paris — XI from 1979 to 1983. He later emigrated to the United States, where he was a professor at Indiana University from 1983 until retirement. Beginning in 2000, he was a teacher and researcher at Texas A&M University, where he was a Distinguished Professor.

Together with Béla Szőkefalvi-Nagy, Foias proved the celebrated commutant lifting theorem. The Foias constant is named after him. Foias is listed as an ISI highly cited researcher. In 1994 he was elected honorary member of the Romanian Academy.

He died in Tempe, Arizona on March 22, 2020. That year, the American Mathematical Society established the Ciprian Foias Prize in Operator Theory, which is awarded every three years.

== Publications ==
- with Ion Colojoară: Theory of generalized spectral operators. Gordon and Breach, 1968. MR 0394282
- with Béla Szőkefalvi-Nagy: Harmonic analysis of operators on Hilbert Space. North Holland 1970 (Translated from the French; first edition: Masson 1967). MR 0275190
- with Peter Constantin, Roger Temam: Attractors representing turbulent flows. Memoirs of the American Mathematical Society, vol. 53, 1985. MR 0776345
- with Hari Bercovici, Carl Pearcy: Dual algebras with applications to invariant subspaces and dilation theory. CBMS Regional Conf. Ser. in Math., vol. 56, American Mathematical Society, 1985. MR 0787041
- with Peter Constantin: Navier Stokes Equations. University of Chicago Press, 1988. ISBN 0-226-11548-8. MR 0972259
- with Peter Constantin, Roger Temam, and Basil Nicolaenko: Integral Manifolds and Inertial Manifolds for Dissipative Partial Differential Equations. Springer-Verlag, Applied Mathematical Sciences Series, volume 70, 1988.
- with Hitay Özbay, Allen Tannenbaum: Robust control of infinite dimensional systems. Springer, 1995.
- with Roger Temam, Oscar Manley, and Ricardo Rosa: Navier Stokes equations and Turbulence. Cambridge University Press, 2001. ISBN 0-521-36032-3 MR 1855030

== See also ==
- Attractor
- Evolution equation
