= Alexandru Lahovari National College =

Romanian high school

Coordinates: 45.1085°N 24.3646°E

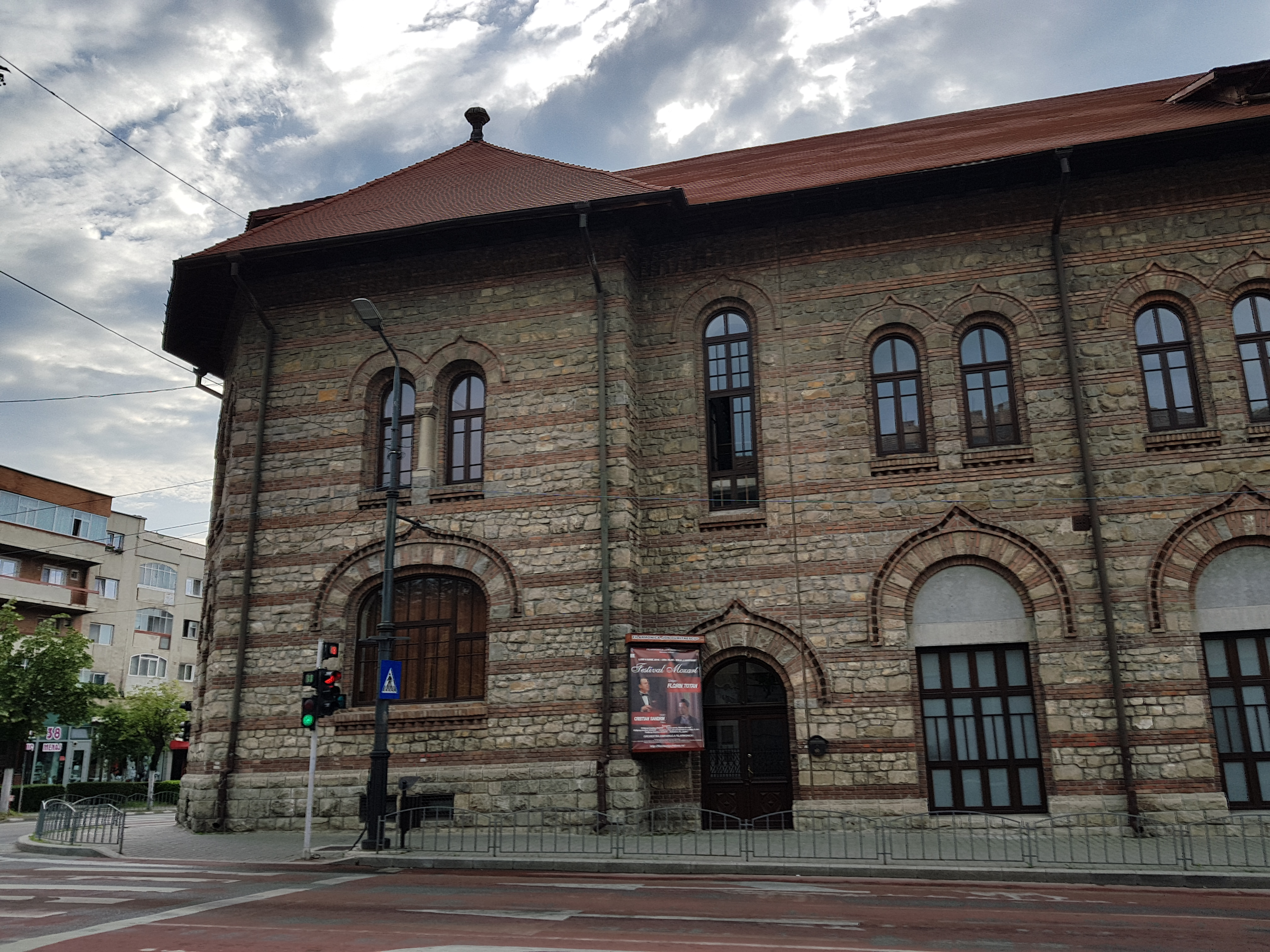
Alexandru Lahovari National College

Alexandru Lahovari National College (Romanian: Colegiul Național Alexandru Lahovari) is a high school located at 19 General Praporgescu Street, Râmnicu Vâlcea, Romania.

== History ==
The school opened as a gymnasium in September 1891. Initially offering just one grade, it expanded to four by 1894. In 1899, it was named after the late statesman Alexandru Lahovary. At the turn of the 20th century, the school was located in the old seminary on the grounds of the cathedral. As this was inadequate, a new building was started in 1909 and finished in 1911; Nicolae Ghica-Budești was the architect. Hosting 155 students, it soon became a representative building of the city.

A first attempt to add a high school was made in 1913, but was dropped due to World War I. In 1919, the transformation to a high school was successful. The institution went from eight to twelve grades, and a new wing was added at great cost. By the time World War II began, the building had a third wing; during the conflict, part of the structure was used as a hospital.

Starting in 1956, girls were admitted and the school became co-educational. In 1965, it was renamed after Nicolae Bălcescu. The Lahovari name was restored following the Romanian Revolution. It was declared a national college in 1997. The school building is listed as a historic monument by Romania's Ministry of Culture and Religious Affairs.

== Alumni ==
- Dan Burghelea
- Mihail Fărcășanu
- Virgil Ierunca
- Nicolae Manolescu
- Gib Mihăescu
- Dem Rădulescu
- Dinu Săraru
