= Solomon Marcus =

Romanian mathematician (1925–2016)

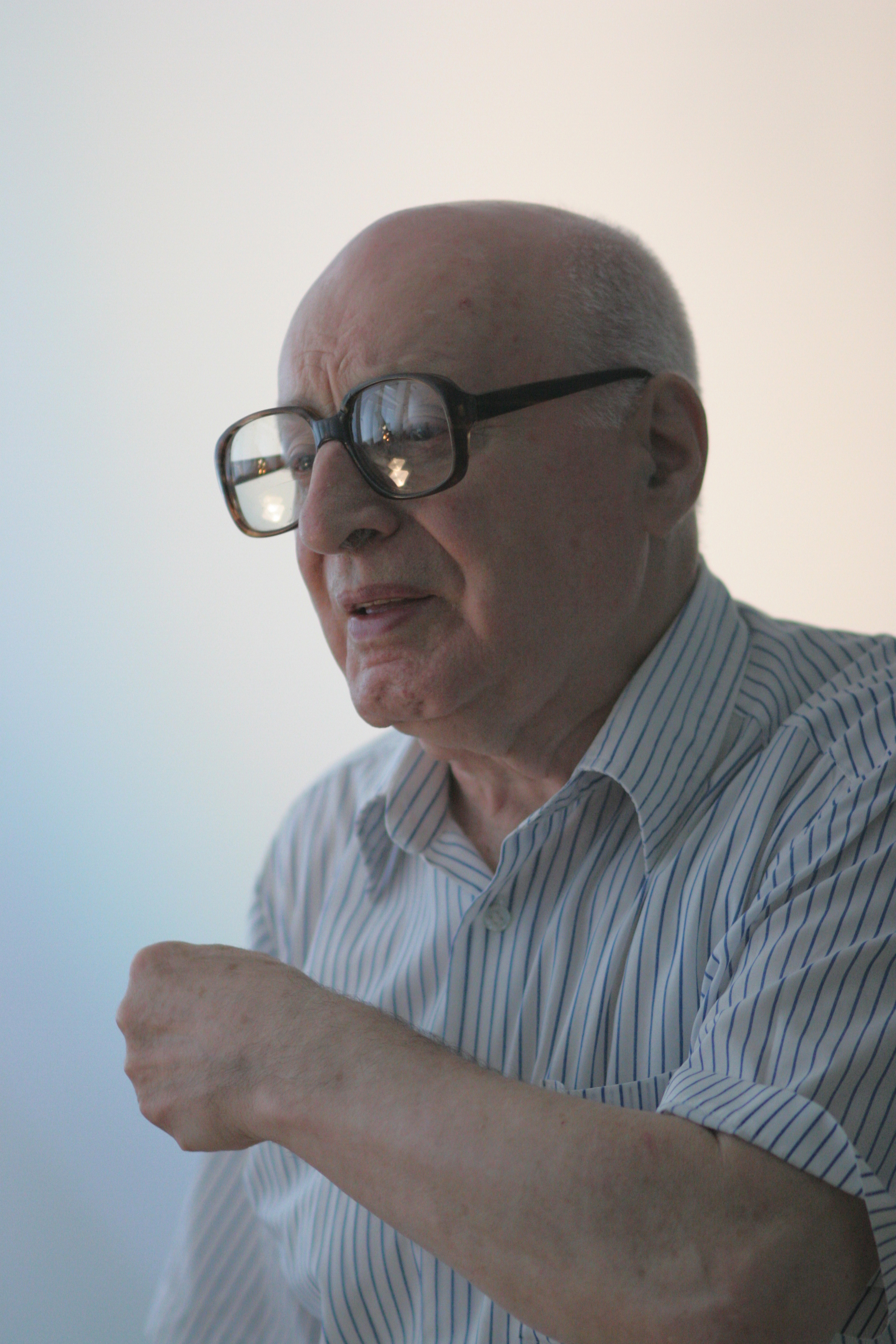
- Solomon Marcus in 2007.
- Born: 1 March 1925; Bacău, Kingdom of Romania
- Died: 17 March 2016 (aged 91); Bucharest, Romania
- Education: University of Bucharest
- Awards: National Order of Faithful Service, Grand Officer rank Order of the Star of Romania, Commander rank
- Scientific career
- Fields: Mathematics
- Workplaces: University of Bucharest
- Doctoral advisor: Miron Nicolescu
- Doctoral students: Cristian S. Calude; Gheorghe Păun; Ileana Streinu

Solomon Marcus (Romanian pronunciation: [ˈsolomon ˈmarkus]; 1 March 1925 – 17 March 2016) was a Romanian mathematician, member of the Mathematical Section of the Romanian Academy (full member from 2001) and emeritus professor of the University of Bucharest's Faculty of Mathematics.

His main research was in the fields of mathematical analysis, mathematical and computational linguistics and computer science. He also published numerous papers on various cultural topics: poetics, linguistics, semiotics, philosophy, and history of science and education.

== Early life and education ==
He was born in Bacău, Romania, to Sima and Alter Marcus, a Jewish family of tailors. From an early age he had to live through dictatorships, war, infringements on free speech and free thinking as well as anti-Semitism. At the age of 16 or 17 he started tutoring younger pupils in order to help his family financially.

He graduated from Ferdinand I High School in 1944, and completed his studies at the University of Bucharest's Faculty of Science, Department of Mathematics, in 1949. He continued tutoring throughout college and later recounted in an interview that he had to endure hunger during those years and that till the age of 20 he only wore hand-me-downs from his older brothers.

== Academic career ==
Marcus obtained his PhD in Mathematics in 1956, with a thesis on the Monotonic functions of two variables, written under the direction of Miron Nicolescu. He was appointed Lecturer in 1955, Associate Professor in 1964, and became a Professor in 1966 (Emeritus in 1991).

Marcus has contributed to the following areas:

1. Mathematical Analysis, Set Theory, Measure and Integration Theory, and Topology
2. Theoretical Computer Science
3. Linguistics
4. Poetics and Theory of Literature
5. Semiotics
6. Cultural Anthropology
7. History and Philosophy of Science
8. Education.

== Publications by and on Marcus ==
Marcus published about 50 books, which have been translated into English, French, German, Italian, Spanish, Russian, Greek, Hungarian, Czech, Serbo-Croatian, and about 400 research articles in specialized journals in almost all European countries, in the United States, Canada, South America, Japan, India, and New Zealand among others; he is cited by more than a thousand authors, including mathematicians, computer scientists, linguists, literary researchers, semioticians, anthropologists and philosophers.

He is recognised as one of the initiators of mathematical linguistics and of mathematical poetics, and has been a member of the editorial board of tens of international scientific journals covering all his domains of interest.

Marcus is featured in the 1999 book People and Ideas in Theoretical Computer Science. and the 2015 The Human Face of Computing . A collection of his papers in English followed by some interviews and a brief autobiography was published in 2007 as Words and Languages Everywhere.

The book Meetings with Solomon Marcus (Spandugino Publishing House, Bucharest, Romania, 2010, 1500 pages), edited by Lavinia Spandonide and Gheorghe Păun for Marcus' 85th birthday, includes recollections by several hundred people from a large variety of scientific and cultural fields, and from 25 countries. It also contains a longer autobiography.

== Death ==
Marcus died of cardiac infections at the Fundeni Clinical Institute in Bucharest after a short stay at Elias Hospital in Bucharest.

== Honours ==
- National Order of Faithful Service in the rank of Grand Officer, 2011.
- Order of the Star of Romania (Romania's highest civil Order) in the rank of Commander, 2015.
- (Romania) Romanian Royal Family: Knight of the Royal Decoration of Nihil Sine Deo.
