= Livezile, Mehedinți =

Livezile
- Commune
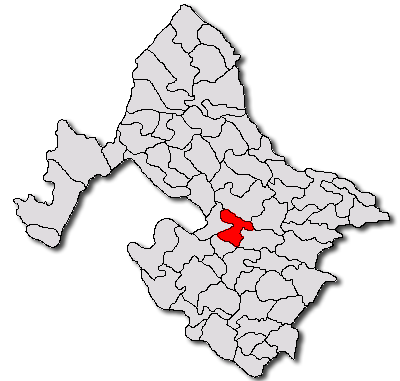
- Location in Mehedinți County

- Location in Romania
- Coordinates: 44°31′N 22°52′E
- Country: Romania
- County: Mehedinți

Government
  - Mayor (2020–2024): Adrian-Ion Nănuți (PSD)
- Area: 66.49 km^{2} (25.67 sq mi)
- Elevation: 172 m (564 ft)
- Population (2021-12-01): 1,424
  - Density: 21/km^{2} (55/sq mi)
- Time zone: EET/EEST (UTC+2/+3)
- Postal code: 227310
- Area code: +40 252
- Vehicle reg.: MH
- Website: comunalivezilemh.ro

Livezile is a commune located in Mehedinți County, Oltenia, Romania. It has 1,424 inhabitants as of 2021. It is composed of five villages: Izvorălu de Jos, Izvoru Aneștilor, Livezile, Petriș, and Ștefan Odobleja (Valea Izvorului until 2005).

The commune is located in the central part of Mehedinți County, 25 km (16 mi) southeast of the county seat, Drobeta-Turnu Severin.

== Natives ==
- Ștefan Odobleja (1902–1978), physician and scientist, one of the precursors of cybernetics and artificial intelligence
