= Lipova, Bacău =

Lipova
- Commune
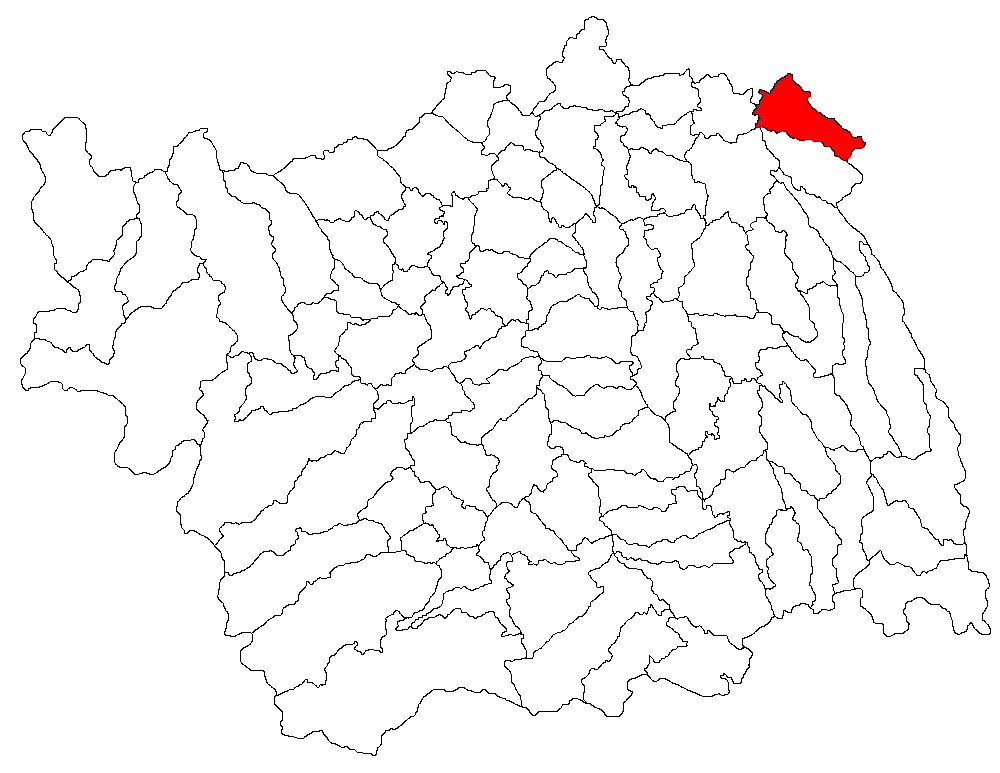
- Location in Bacău County

- Location in Romania
- Coordinates: 46°43′N 27°14′E
- Country: Romania
- County: Bacău

Government
  - Mayor (2024–2028): Costel Baciu (PSD)
- Area: 54.19 km^{2} (20.92 sq mi)
- Elevation: 254 m (833 ft)
- Population (2021-12-01): 2,853
  - Density: 52.65/km^{2} (136.4/sq mi)
- Time zone: UTC+02:00 (EET)
  - Summer (DST): UTC+03:00 (EEST)
- Postal code: 607275
- Area code: +(40) 0234
- Vehicle reg.: BC
- Website: www.comunalipova.ro

Lipova is a commune in Bacău County, Western Moldavia, Romania. It is composed of seven villages: Lipova, Mâlosu, Satu Nou, Valea Caselor, Valea Hogei, Valea Mărului, and Valea Moșneagului.

== Natives ==
- Gheorghe Vrănceanu (1900–1979), mathematician
