= Nicolae Popescu =

Romanian mathematician

- Born: 22 September 1937; Strehaia-Comanda, Kingdom of Romania
- Died: 29 July 2010 (aged 72); Bucharest, Romania
- Education: University of Bucharest
- Known for: Contributions to abelian category theory, non-Artinian rings/semi-Artinian rings and modules, Gabriel–Popescu theorem
- Scientific career
- Fields: Mathematics, Category theory
- Workplaces: Institute of Mathematics of the Romanian Academy; University of Bucharest
- Thesis: Krull–Remak–Schmidt Theorem and Theory of Decomposition (1967)
- Doctoral advisor: Gheorghe Galbură
- Doctoral students: Adrian Ioviță; Alexandru Zaharescu

Nicolae Popescu (Romanian: [nikoˈla.e poˈpesku]; 22 September 1937 – 29 July 2010) was a Romanian mathematician and professor at the University of Bucharest. He also held a research position at the Institute of Mathematics of the Romanian Academy, and was elected a corresponding Member of the Romanian Academy in 1997.

He is best known for his contributions to algebra and the theory of abelian categories. From 1964 to 2007 he collaborated with Pierre Gabriel on the characterization of abelian categories; their best-known result is the Gabriel–Popescu theorem, published in 1964. His areas of expertise were category theory, abelian categories with applications to rings and modules, adjoint functors, limits and colimits, the theory of sheaves, the theory of rings, fields and polynomials, and valuation theory. He also had interests and published in algebraic topology, algebraic geometry, commutative algebra, K-theory, class field theory, and algebraic function theory.

== Biography ==
Popescu was born on September 22, 1937, in Strehaia-Comanda, Mehedinți County, Romania. In 1954 he graduated from the Carol I High School in Craiova and went on to study mathematics at the University of Iași. In his third year of studies he was expelled from the university, having been deemed "hostile to the regime" for remarking that "the achievements of American scientists are also worth consideration." He then went back home to Strehaia, where he worked for a year in a collective farm, after which he was admitted in 1959 to the University of Bucharest, only to start anew as a freshman. Popescu earned his M.S. degree in mathematics in 1964, and his Ph.D. degree in mathematics in 1967, with a thesis titled as Krull–Remak–Schmidt Theorem and Theory of Decomposition written under the direction of Gheorghe Galbură. He was awarded a D. Phil. degree (Doctor Docent) in 1972, also by the University of Bucharest.

While still a student, Popescu focused on category theory. He first approached the general theory, with its connections to homological algebra and algebraic topology, then shifted his focus to the theory of Abelian categories, being one of the main promoters of this theory in Romania. He carried out mathematics studies at the Institute of Mathematics of the Romanian Academy in the Algebra research group, and also had international collaborations on three continents. He shared many moral, ethical, and religious values with Alexander Grothendieck, who visited the Faculty of Mathematics in Bucharest in 1968. Like Grothendieck, he had a long-standing interest in category theory and number theory, and supported promising young mathematicians in his fields of interest. He also promoted the early developments of category theory applications in relational biology and mathematical biophysics/mathematical biology.

== Academic positions ==
Popescu was appointed as a Lecturer at the University of Bucharest in 1968, where he taught graduate students until 1972. Starting in 1964, he also held a research appointment at the Institute of Mathematics of the Romanian Academy. The institute was closed in 1976 by order of Nicolae Ceaușescu (for reasons related to his daughter Zoia Ceaușescu, who had been hired at the institute two years before), but was reopened in 1990, after the Romanian Revolution.

== Publications ==
Between 1962 and 2008, Popescu published more than 102 papers in peer-reviewed mathematics journals, several monographs on the theory of sheaves, and several books on abelian category theory and abstract algebra, including

- Popescu, Nicolae (1968). Elemente de teoria algebrică a numerelor [Elements of the Algebraic Theory of Numbers] (in Romanian). Universitatea București.
- Popescu, Nicolae; Radu, Alexandru (1971). Teoria categoriilor și a fasciculelor [Category Theory and Sheaves] (in Romanian). Editura Științifică.
- Popescu, Nicolae (1971). Categorii abeliene [Abelian Categories] (in Romanian). Editura Academiei. MR 0322011.
- Popescu, Nicolae (1973). Abelian categories with applications to rings and modules. London Mathematical Society Monographs. Vol. 3. London: Academic Press. ISBN 0-12-561550-7. MR 0340375.
- Popescu, Nicolae; Popescu, Liliana (1979). Theory of categories. Martinus Nijhoff Publishers, The Hague; Sijthoff & Noordhoff International Publishers, Alphen aan den Rijn. doi:10.1007/978-94-009-9550-5. ISBN 90-286-0168-6. MR 0538276.

In a Grothendieck-like, energetic style, he initiated and provided scientific leadership to several seminars on category theory, sheaves and abstract algebra, which resulted in a continuous stream of high-quality mathematical publications in international, peer-reviewed mathematics journals by several members participating in his Seminar series.

== Personal life ==
Popescu died in Bucharest on July 29, 2010. He is survived by his wife, Professor Dr. Elena Liliana Popescu (a mathematician, poet, literary translator and editor), and their three children, one of whom, Dan Cristian Popescu, is a politician.

== Recognition ==
In 1971, Popescu received the Simion Stoilow Prize in Mathematics of the Romanian Academy. He was elected President of the Romanian Mathematical Society in 1990 and a corresponding Member of the Romanian Academy in 1997. On the 80th anniversary of his birthday, the Faculty of Mathematics and Informatics at the University of Bucharest and the Institute of Mathematics of the Romanian Academy organized a conference in his memory.
