= Ișcălău =

- Commune
- Location within Moldova
- Coordinates: 47.5727777778°N 27.8191666667°E
- Country: Moldova
- District: Fălești District

Government
  - Mayor: Stoian Dumitru (PCRM (Partidul Comunist al Republicii Moldova))

Population (2014)
  - Total: 2,441
- Time zone: UTC+2 (EET)
  - Summer (DST): UTC+3 (EEST)

Ișcălău is a commune in Făleşti District, Moldova. It is composed of three villages: Burghelea, Doltu and Ișcălău.
