= Simion Stoilow =

Romanian mathematician and author

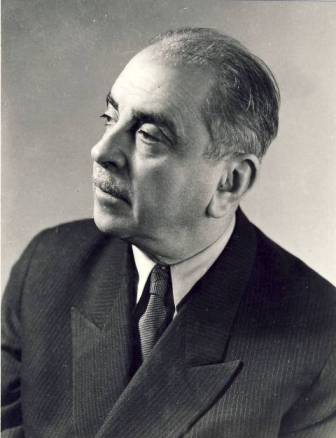
- Born: 14 September 1887; Bucharest, Kingdom of Romania
- Died: 4 April 1961 (aged 73); Bucharest, Romanian People's Republic
- Education: University of Paris
- Known for: Complex analysis Kerékjártó–Stoilow compactification Iversen–Stoilow surface Stoilov theorem Open and closed maps
- Awards: Legion of Honour; Order of the Star of Romania; Order of the Star of the Romanian People's Republic
- Scientific career
- Fields: Mathematics
- Workplaces: University of Iași; University of Cernăuți; Polytechnic University of Bucharest; University of Bucharest; Institute of Mathematics of the Romanian Academy
- Thesis: Sur une classe de fonctions de deux variables définies par les équations linéaires aux dérivées partielles (1916)
- Doctoral advisor: Émile Picard
- Doctoral students: Cabiria Andreian Cazacu
- Other notable students: Tudor Ganea; Valentin Poénaru

Simion Stoilow or Stoilov (14 September [O.S. 2 September] 1887 – 4 April 1961) was a Romanian mathematician, creator of the Romanian school of complex analysis, and author of over 100 publications.

== Biography ==
He was born in Bucharest, and grew up in Craiova. His father, Colonel Simion Stoilow, fought at the Battle of Smârdan in the Romanian War of Independence. After studying at the Obedeanu elementary school and the Carol I High School, Stoilow went in 1907 to the University of Paris, where he earned a B.S. degree in 1910 and a Ph.D. in Mathematics in 1916. His doctoral dissertation was written under the direction of Émile Picard.

He returned to Romania in 1916 to fight in the Romanian Campaign of World War I, first in Dobrudja, then in Moldavia. After the war, he became professor of mathematics at the University of Iași (1919–1921) and the University of Cernăuți (1921–1939). He was an Invited Speaker of the International Congress of Mathematicians in 1920 at Strasbourg, in 1928 at Bologna, and in 1936 at Oslo. In 1928 he was awarded the Legion of Honour, Officer rank. In 1939 he moved to Bucharest, working first at the Polytechnic University of Bucharest, and from 1941 at the University of Bucharest, serving as rector from 1944 to 1946 and as dean of the Faculties of Mathematics and Physics from 1948 to 1951.

From 1946 to 1948, he served as Romanian ambassador to France. In 1946 he was a member of the Romanian delegation at the Paris Peace Conference, headed by Gheorghe Tătărescu. In July 1947 he organized at Club de Chaillot the exhibit "L'art français au secours des enfants roumains"; Constantin Brâncuși participated, Tristan Tzara and Jean Cassou wrote the preface to the catalogue. In 1946 he was awarded the Order of the Star of Romania, Grand Officer rank and in 1948, the Order of the Star of the Romanian People's Republic, Second class.

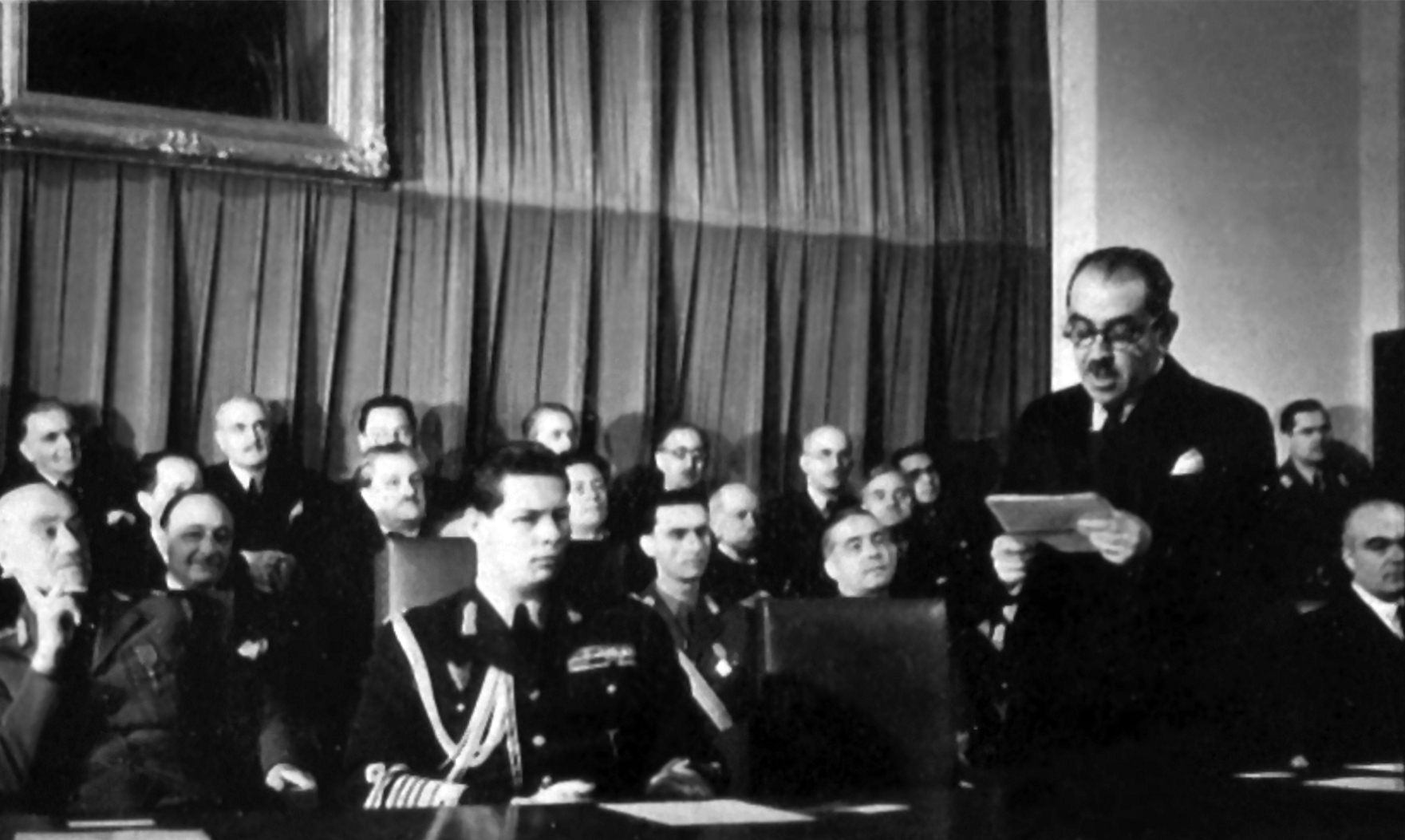
Prime Minister Nicolae Rădescu and King Michael I listening to Stoilow, Rector of the University of Bucharest, at the opening celebration for the 1945–1946 academic year

Stoilow was elected corresponding member of the Romanian Academy in 1936, and full member in 1945, and later became president of the Physics and Mathematics section of the Academy. In 1949 he was the founding director of the Institute of Mathematics of the Romanian Academy, serving in that capacity until he died. Among his students at the University of Bucharest and at the Institute were Cabiria Andreian Cazacu, Romulus Cristescu, Martin Jurchescu, Ionel Bucur, and Aristide Deleanu, as well as Nicolae Boboc, Corneliu Constantinescu, and Aurel Cornea. Some of the first Romanian topologists who obtained their candidate’s theses were Stoilow’s students Tudor Ganea, Israel Berstein, Aristide Deleanu, Valentin Poénaru, and Kostake Teleman.

In 1952, Stoilow was awarded the Order of the Star of the Romanian People's Republic, First class.

Stoilow died in Bucharest in 1961 of a brain stroke. He was cremated at the Cenușa crematorium. Prior to the Romanian Revolution of 1989, his funeral urn was maintained in a crypt at the Carol Park Mausoleum.

== Legacy ==
The Institute of Mathematics of the Romanian Academy (closed in 1975 by a decree of Nicolae Ceaușescu, reopened in the immediate aftermath of the 1989 Revolution), is now named after him. The Simion Stoilow Prize is awarded every year by the Romanian Academy.

== Work ==
- Siméon Stoilow (1916). Sur une classe de fonctions de deux variables définies par les équations linéaires aux dérivées partielles (PDF) (Thesis). Vol. VI u. 84 S. 4. Paris: Gauthier-Villars. JFM 46.1481.03.
- Siméon Stoïlow (1919). "Sur les singularités mobiles des intégrales des équations linéaires aux dérivées partielles et sur leur intégrale générale" (PDF). Annales Scientifiques de l'École Normale Supérieure. (3). 36: 235–262. doi:10.24033/asens.717. JFM 47.0946.01.
- Simion Stoïlow, "Leçons sur les principes topologiques de la théorie des fonctions analytiques", Gauthier-Villars, Paris, 1956. MR 0082545
- Simion Stoïlow, "Œuvre mathématique", Éditions de l'Académie de la République Populaire Roumaine, Bucharest, 1964. MR 0168435
