= Romanian Mathematical Society =

Mathematical society in Romania

- Societatea de Științe Matematice din România
- Abbreviation: SSMR
- Formation: 1910; 116 years ago
- Type: Mathematical society
- Location: Romania
- Director: Radu Gologan
- Website: ssmr.ro
- Formerly called: Societatea Gazeta Matematică

The Romanian Society of Mathematical Sciences (Romanian: Societatea de Științe Matematice din România, SSMR) is a professional organization of Romanian mathematicians founded in 1910, as a result of the efforts of several Romanian mathematics lovers. It is recognised by the International Mathematics Union as the official mathematical society of Romania.

== History ==
The "Gazeta Matematică" journal, founded in 1895 and whose first issue appeared on September 15, 1895, represented the first professional structuring (outside the educational system) of mathematics in Romania.

The editors of "Gazeta Matematică" decided in August 1909 to establish the "Gazeta Matematică" Society, a professional organization of Romanian mathematicians and mathematics lovers, which was recognized by law by the Chamber of Deputies on April 5, 1910.

== Name ==
The original name of the society ("Societatea Gazeta Matematică") was later changed to "Society of Mathematics and Physics", and then to "Societatea de Științe Matematice din România " (Society of Mathematical Sciences of Romania, also known by the acronym SSMR), a name that has remained until today.

== See also ==
- List of mathematical societies
