= Dan-Virgil Voiculescu =

Romanian mathematician

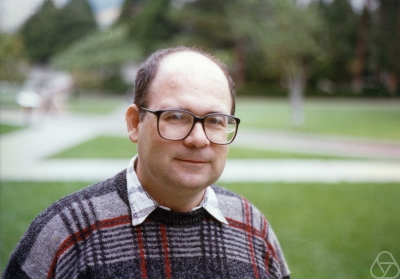
- (photo by George Bergman)
- Born: 14 June 1949 (age 77); Bucharest, Romania
- Education: University of Bucharest
- Scientific career
- Fields: Mathematics
- Workplaces: University of California, Berkeley
- Doctoral advisor: Ciprian Foias
- Doctoral students: Sorin Popa

Dan-Virgil Voiculescu (Romanian pronunciation: [dan virˈd͡ʒil vojkuˈlesku]; born 14 June 1949) is a Romanian professor of mathematics at the University of California, Berkeley. He has worked in single operator theory, operator K-theory and von Neumann algebras. More recently, he developed free probability theory.

== Education and career ==
Voiculescu studied at the University of Bucharest, receiving his PhD in 1977 under the direction of Ciprian Foias. He was an assistant at the University of Bucharest (1972–1973), a researcher at the Institute of Mathematics of the Romanian Academy (1973–1975), and a researcher at INCREST (1975–1986). He came to Berkeley in 1986 for the International Congress of Mathematicians, and stayed on as visiting professor. Voiculescu was appointed professor at Berkeley in 1987.

== Awards and honors ==
He received the 2004 NAS Award in Mathematics from the National Academy of Sciences (NAS) for “the theory of free probability, in particular, using random matrices and a new concept of entropy to solve several hitherto intractable problems in von Neumann algebras.”

Voiculescu was elected to the National Academy of Sciences in 2006. In 2012 he became a fellow of the American Mathematical Society.
