= Octav Onicescu =

Romanian mathematician

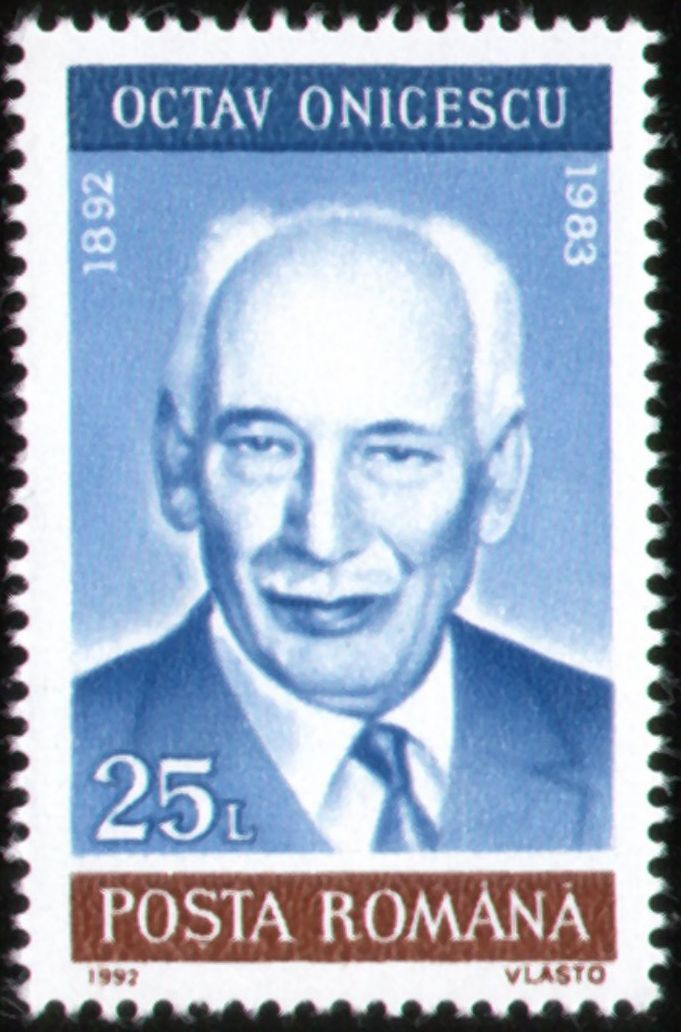
Octav Onicescu stamp from Romania

Octav Onicescu (Romanian pronunciation: [okˈtav oniˈt͡ʃesku]; August 20, 1892 – August 19, 1983) was a Romanian mathematician and a member of the Romanian Academy. Together with his student, Gheorghe Mihoc, he is considered to be the founder of the Romanian school of probability theory and statistics.

== Biography ==
He was born in Botoșani, the son of Vlad Onicescu, from Ștefănești, Botoșani County, and Ana, from Oniceni, Neamț County. He graduated from the Botoșani A. T. Laurian High School in 1911 with a perfect average grade of 10. That same year, he entered the University of Bucharest, from where he graduated with degrees in mathematics and philosophy in 1913. From 1914 to 1916 he was a mathematics teacher at the military gymnasium of Dealu Monastery, near Târgoviște. From 1916 to 1918 he fought in World War I.

In 1919, Onicescu went to study geometry at the University of Rome, under the guidance of Tullio Levi-Civita. He earned his PhD in June, 1920 for a thesis titled Sopra gli spazi einsteiniani a gruppi continui di transformazione ("On Einstein manifolds and groups of continuous transformations"). The thesis, which dealt with problems in differential geometry related to Albert Einstein's theory of relativity, was defended in front of a jury of 11 mathematicians, including Levi-Civita, Vito Volterra, and Guido Castelnuovo.

In the fall of 1920 he went to Paris, where he gave talks in Jacques Hadamard's seminar at the Collège de France. While in Paris, he organized a seminar with other Romanian mathematicians, including Petre Sergescu, Șerban Gheorghiu, Alexandru Pantazi, and Șerban Coculescu.

In 1922, he returned to Bucharest, where he embarked on a 40-year-long university career. In 1924, he started teaching the first college-level probability theory course in Romania. From 1928 on, he was professor at the Faculty of Sciences of the University of Bucharest, and was appointed full professor in 1931. In 1930, he organized the School of Statistics and established an Institute of Calculus, serving as its director for many years. In 1936 he entered the Legionary Movement. The Romanian poet and mathematician Ion Barbu (Dan Barbilian) was a close friend of his.

Onicescu was an invited speaker at the International Congress of Mathematicians in 1928 at Bologna and in 1936 at Oslo. He was elected corresponding member of the Romanian Academy in 1933, and became titular member on February 4, 1965. He was in charge of the Probability Theory section of the Institute of Mathematics of the Romanian Academy.

He died in Bucharest on the eve of his 91st birthday, after a short illness.

== Legacy ==
Onicescu was one of the founders of the Balkan Union of Mathematicians (in 1934) and of the International Centre for Mechanical Sciences in Udine (in 1968).

The "Octav Onicescu" museum, founded in Botoșani in October 1995, houses furniture and memorabilia that belonged to him, including manuscripts, letters, diplomas, books, photographs, and military decorations. The memorial house doesn't exist anymore.

Oniscescu defined and studied the information energy and correlation coefficient in information theory.
