= Gheorghe Mihoc =

Romanian mathematician and statistician

- Born: July 7, 1906; Brăila, Kingdom of Romania
- Died: December 25, 1981 (aged 75); Bucharest, Socialist Republic of Romania
- Education: University of Rome; University of Bucharest
- Known for: co-founder, together with Octav Onicescu, of the Romanian school of probability
- Awards: Order of the Star of the Romanian Socialist Republic
- Scientific career
- Fields: Mathematics
- Workplaces: University of Bucharest; Bucharest Academy of Economic Studies
- Theses: (1930); On the general properties of interdependent statistical variables (1934)
- Doctoral advisors: Guido Castelnuovo; Octav Onicescu

Gheorghe Mihoc (July 7, 1906 – December 25, 1981) was a Romanian mathematician and statistician.

He was born in Brăila, the son of Ecaterina and Gheorghe Mihoc, both originally from the Banat. In 1908, his father moved the family to Bucharest. Here he attended elementary school and the Gheorghe Șincai High School. In 1925 Mihoc enrolled at the University of Bucharest, Faculty of Sciences, and was awarded his degree in mathematics in June 1928.

He then went to Italy and studied statistics and actuarial studies at the University of Rome; he earned a Doctor of Statistical and Actuarial Sciences in July 1930, under the direction of Guido Castelnuovo. In 1930 he was appointed professor in the School of Statistics, Actuarial Studies, and Calculation, which had been established that year (it later became an Institute). The school was headed by Octav Onicescu. There Mihoc taught courses in actuarial mathematics from 1930 to 1948.

On April 28, 1934, he earned his Doctorate in Mathematics from the University of Bucharest, in front of a commission consisting of Dimitrie Pompeiu, as chairman, Anton Davidoglu, and Onicescu. The subject of his thesis, written under the direction of Onicescu, was On the general properties of interdependent statistical variables.

From 1937, Mihoc went to the University of Bucharest as assistant to Octav Onicescu, first at mechanics, then at algebra and probabilities calculation (1937–1942). That same year (1937) he also taught general mathematics with the students from the preparation year of Politehnica University of Bucharest. Between 1942 and 1946 he was conference lecturer of general mathematics at the Faculty of Physics and Chemistry of the University of Bucharest. Then, in 1946, he was appointed professor at the Academy of Higher-level Commercial and Industrial Studies, for financial mathematics (1946–1949).

In 1948, after the reform of education in all degrees, he was appointed head of the department of probability calculation and mathematical statistics at the Faculty of Mathematics and Physics at the University of Bucharest, then as professor and head of the department of applied mathematics. From fall 1962 he was again professor and head of the department of probability calculation and mathematical statistics (successor to Onicescu). As a leading specialist in probability and statistics, he was invited to different countries to give lectures in the field. Mihoc supervised 6 Ph.D. students at the University of Bucharest, including Marius Iosifescu and Radu Theodorescu.

As statistician and actuary, Mihoc was employed starting in 1929 at the Central House of Social Insurance. He worked here as director at the directorate of insurance (1939–1940), as director of the directorate of pensions (1940–1942), as director of the Office of Studies and Actuary (1942–1945). He was administrator at the House of Pensions of Writers (1940–1945) and the House of Pensions of Composers, Painters and Sculptors (1940–1943). In 1945 he was appointed chief actuary of the Central House of Social Insurance.

Mihoc was dean of the Faculty of Mathematics and Physics of the University of Bucharest from 1951 until 1960; from 1960 to 1963 he was prorector, and in July 1963 he was appointed rector of the University of Bucharest. He was a corresponding member of the Romanian Academy from 1955 until 1963, after which he was elected titular member at the section of mathematical sciences. From March 19, 1980, until his death in 1981, Mihoc served as President of the Romanian Academy.

In April 1964 he was appointed director of the Statistical Centre of the academy. He was an editor of Gazeta Matematică and member of the board of C.R.C.C.S. In November 1964 Mihoc was awarded the title of Honorary Professor. In 1971 he was awarded the Order of the Star of the Romanian Socialist Republic, Second class.

A private high school in Bucharest, Sector 1 (founded in 1997) is named after both Onicescu and Mihoc.
