= Gheorghe Vrănceanu =

Romanian mathematician

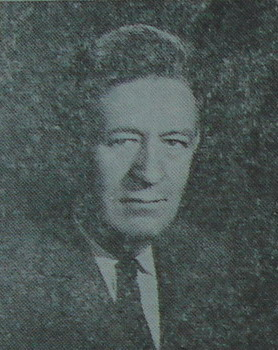
- Born: June 30, 1900; Valea Hogei, Vaslui County, Romania (now Lipova, Bacău County)
- Died: April 27, 1979 (aged 78); Bucharest, Romania
- Resting place: Bellu Cemetery, Bucharest
- Education: University of Iași; University of Rome
- Scientific career
- Fields: Mathematics
- Workplaces: University of Iași; University of Cernăuți; University of Bucharest
- Thesis: Sopra una teorema di Weierstrass e le sue applicazioni alla stabilità (1924)
- Doctoral advisor: Tullio Levi-Civita
- Doctoral students: Henri Moscovici; Kostake Teleman

Gheorghe Vrănceanu (June 30, 1900 – April 27, 1979) was a Romanian mathematician, best known for his work in differential geometry and topology. He was titular member of the Romanian Academy and vice-president of the International Mathematical Union.

== Biography ==
He was born in 1900 in Valea Hogei, then a village in Vaslui County, now a component of Lipova commune, in Bacău County. He was the eldest of five children in his family. After attending primary school in his village and high school in Vaslui, he went to study mathematics at the University of Iași in 1919. There, he took courses with Alexandru Myller, Vera Myller, Simion Sanielevici, Victor Vâlcovici, and Simion Stoilow. After graduating in 1922, he went in 1923 to the University of Göttingen, where he studied under David Hilbert. Thereafter, he went to the University of Rome, where he studied under Tullio Levi-Civita, obtaining his doctorate on November 5, 1924, with thesis Sopra una teorema di Weierstrass e le sue applicazioni alla stabilità. The thesis defense committee was composed of 11 faculty, and was headed by Vito Volterra.

Vrănceanu returned to Iași, where he was appointed a lecturer at the university. In 1927–1928, he was awarded a Rockefeller Foundation scholarship to study in France and the United States, where he was in a contact with Élie Cartan and Oswald Veblen. In 1929, he returned to Romania, and was appointed professor at the University of Cernăuți. In 1939, he moved to the University of Bucharest, where he was appointed Head of the Geometry and Topology department in 1948, a position he held until his retirement in 1970. His doctoral students include Henri Moscovici and Kostake Teleman.

Vrănceanu was elected to the Romanian Academy as a corresponding member in 1946, then as a full member in 1955. From 1964 he was president of the Mathematics Section of the Romanian Academy. Also from 1964, he was an editor of the journal Revue Roumaine de mathématiques pures et appliquées, founded that year. At the International Congress of Mathematicians held in Vancouver, Canada in 1974, he was elected vice-president of the International Mathematical Union, a position he held from 1975 to 1978. He died in Bucharest in 1979 of an intestinal obstruction and was buried at the city's Bellu Cemetery.

A high school in Bacău (Colegiul Național "Gheorghe Vrânceanu") is named after him, and so is a school in Lipova.

== Research ==
During his career, Vrănceanu published over 300 articles in journals throughout the world. His work covers a whole range of modern geometry, from the classical theory of surfaces, to the notion of non-holonomic spaces, which he discovered.

In 1928 he gave an invited talk at the International Congress of Mathematicians in Bologna, titled Parallelisme et courbure dans une variété non holonome. In it, he introduced the notion of "non-holonomic manifolds," which are smooth manifolds provided with a smooth distribution that is generally not integrable.

== Publications ==
- Vrănceanu, Gheorghe (1936). Les espaces non holonomes (PDF). Mémorial des sciences mathématiques (in French). Vol. 76. Paris: Gauthier-Villars. OCLC 1149255. Zbl 0013.28105.
- Vrănceanu, Gheorghe (1957). Leçons de géométrie différentielle, 2 Vols (in French). Bucharest: Éditions de l' Académie de la République Populaire Roumaine. MR 0124823. OCLC 488528715.
- Vrănceanu, Gheorghe (1959). "Tenseurs harmoniques et groupes de mouvement d'un espace de Riemann". Commentarii Mathematici Helvetici (in French). 33 (1): 161–173. doi:10.1007/BF02565914. MR 0107274. S2CID 120038943.
- Vrănceanu, Gheorghe; Ganea, Tudor (1961). "Topological embeddings of lens spaces". Proceedings of the Cambridge Philosophical Society. 57 (3): 688–690. Bibcode:1961PCPS...57..688V. doi:10.1017/S0305004100035751. MR 0124908. S2CID 122012809.
