= Ștefan Odobleja =

Romanian scientist (1902–1978)

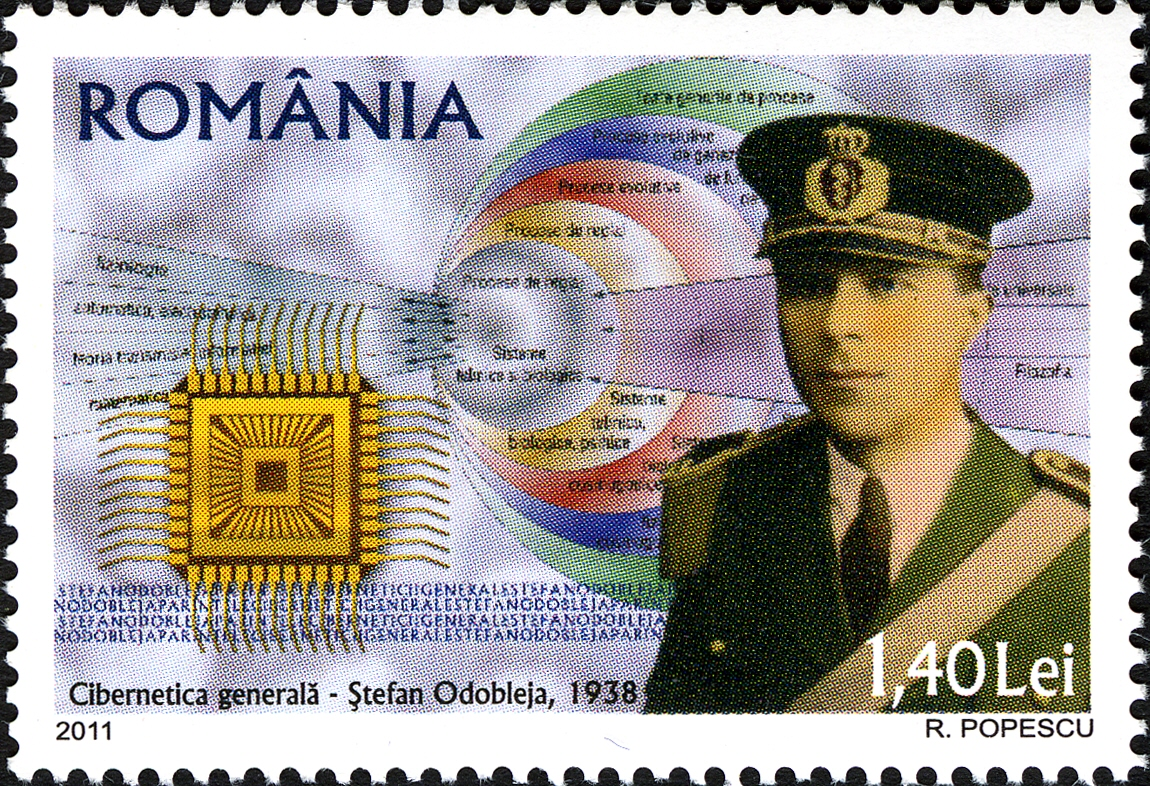
- Born: October 13, 1902; Valea Izvorului, Mehedinți County Kingdom of Romania
- Died: September 4, 1978 (aged 75); Socialist Republic of Romania
- Resting place: Orthodox Cemetery, Drobeta-Turnu Severin, Romania
- Citizenship: Romania
- Education: Carol Davila University of Medicine and Pharmacy
- Occupations: Physician, military doctor, scientist
- Known for: Psychologie consonantiste

Ștefan Odobleja (Romanian pronunciation: [ʃteˈfan odoˈbleʒa]; 13 October 1902 – 4 September 1978) was a Romanian physician, scientist, and philosopher. He was known for his contributions to the study of cybernetics and artificial intelligence.

His major work, Psychologie Consonantiste, first published in 1938-39 in Paris, introduced the concept of feedback in psychology.

== Biography ==
Odobleja was born into a family of peasants in 1902, in Valea Izvorului (now Ștefan Odobleja), Mehedinți County, Romania. He attended the Faculty of Medicine in Bucharest and became a physician. He practiced medicine as a military doctor in cities including Bucharest, Dej, Drobeta Turnu-Severin, Lugoj, and Târgoviște.

In 1936, Odobleja published "Phonoscopy and the clinical semiotics". In 1937, he participated in the IXth International Congress of Military Medicine with a paper entitled "Demonstration de phonoscopie", where he disseminated a prospectus in French, announcing the appearance of his future work, "The Consonantist Psychology".

The most important of his writings is Psychologie consonantiste, in which Odobleja lays the theoretical foundations of the generalized cybernetics. The book, published in Paris by Librairie Maloine (vol. I in 1938 and vol. II in 1939), is nearly 900 pages long, including 300 figures.

The first Romanian edition of this work did not appear until 1982 (the first edition was published in French). The work was reprinted in 1983 as Cybernétique générale: psychologie consonantiste, science des sciences.

Odobleja retired from the army in 1946 and died of cancer on September 4, 1978. He was buried at the Orthodox Cemetery in Drobeta-Turnu Severin.

== Legacy ==
His paper, "Diversity and Unit in Cybernetics" was presented at the Fourth Congress of Cybernetics and Systems in Amsterdam, August in 1978, being reportedly received "with great acclaim". His completed works run to over 50,000 pages.

To reward his work of mapping the then little-known of field consonantist psychology, cybernetics, and general cybernetics, Odobleja was elected posthumously an honorary member of the Romanian Academy in 1990.

In 1982 a group of scientists established in Lugoj the Cybernetics Academy "Ștefan Odobleja", an organization dedicated to promoting a better knowledge of general cybernetics; the organization is registered in Lugano, Switzerland, and is financed by the controversial Romanian billionaire Iosif Constantin Drăgan. High schools in Bucharest, Craiova, and Drobeta-Turnu Severin are named after Ștefan Odobleja. Streets in Bucharest, Craiova, Dej, Drobeta-Turnu Severin, Oradea, and Pitești are also named after him.
