= Institute of Mathematics of the Romanian Academy =

Research institute in Bucharest, Romania

"Simion Stoilow" Institute of Mathematics of the Romanian Academy
- Institutul de Matematică "Simion Stoilow" al Academiei Române
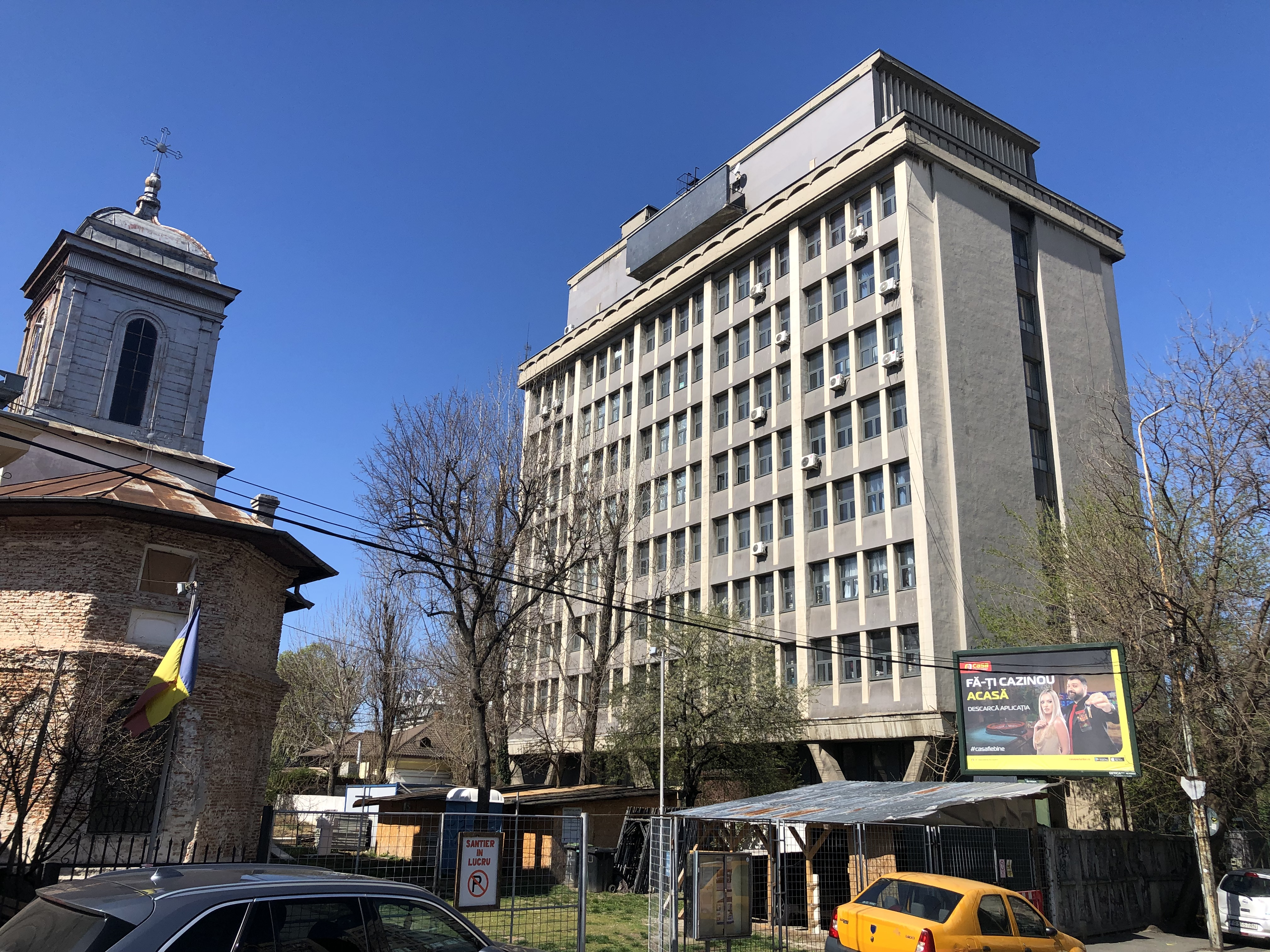
- Established: 1949
- Field of research: Mathematics
- Director: Lucian Beznea
- Location: 21 Calea Griviței Street, Bucharest, 010702, Romania; 44°26′38.75″N 26°05′18.59″E
- Affiliations: Romanian Academy
- Website: www.imar.ro

The "Simion Stoilow" Institute of Mathematics of the Romanian Academy is a research institute in Bucharest, Romania. It is affiliated with the Romanian Academy, and it is named after Simion Stoilow, one of its founders.

== History ==
On December 29, 1945, a group of twenty Romanian mathematicians from various institutions in Bucharest led by Dimitrie Pompeiu held a meeting at the University of Bucharest to establish the Institute of Mathematical Sciences with the aim of "promoting scientific research in mathematical sciences, through communications, talks, publications, congresses, and other means proper to this aim". This group also included Dan Barbilian, Alexandru Froda, Alexandru Ghica, Gheorghe Mihoc, Grigore Moisil, Miron Nicolescu, Octav Onicescu, Stoilow, Gabriel Sudan, Victor Vâlcovici, and Gheorghe Vrănceanu. In January 1946 they registered the Institute as a legal person, specifically an NGO, with the Ilfov County Court.

On June 9, 1948 the new Communist regime revamped the Romanian Academy to an institution modeled on the Academy of Sciences of the USSR, increasing by 1966 the number of its member research centers and institutes from 7 to 56. Among the newly created institutes was the Institute of Mathematics of the Romanian Academy, established in 1949 on the basis of the previous NGO with the contribution of Simion Stoilow, one of the twenty founding members from 1945.

In 1974, Zoia Ceaușescu, a graduate of the Faculty of Mathematics of the University of Bucharest and the daughter of Nicolae Ceaușescu, the communist head of state, was hired by the institute. Her parents were not happy with her choice in studying Mathematics. Provoked by a verbal disagreement with Miron Nicolescu, in April 1975, Ceaușescu issued a decree to close down the Institute. The ensuing disruption of scientific life led to the eventual departure from Romania of a number of leading mathematicians, including Ciprian Foias and Dan-Virgil Voiculescu. In 1978, with help from Zoia Ceaușescu, some of the former members of the Institute were hired into a newly established Mathematical section of the National Institute Scientific and Technical Creation (Institutul Național pentru Creație Științifică și Tehnică, INCREST), previously known as the Institute of Fluid Mechanics and Aerospace Research (Institutul de Mecanică a Fluidelor și Cercetări Aerospațiale, IMFCA), currently a private company (INAV S.A.), owned by Grupul S.C.R.

After the Romanian Revolution of 1989, the Institute of Mathematics of the Romanian Academy (abbreviated IMAR) was re-established on March 8, 1990 by a decree of the post-Communist Romanian government. It was placed under the aegis of the Romanian Academy, itself partially reorganized by a decree of the same government on January 5, 1990.

== Current situation ==
Currently, IMAR is the leading Romanian institution in Mathematics research, with about 100 full- and part-time researchers. In 2000–2004, the Institute was a Centre of Excellence in Research of the European Commission. Since 2008, IMAR has a Laboratoire Européen Associé collaboration with CNRS. The Institute publishes two scientific journals (Mathematical Reports and Revue roumaine de Mathématiques pures et appliquées), and organizes many specialized conferences and congresses. Some of its members are well-known mathematicians.

IMAR also hosts the Theta Foundation, a not-for-profit independent publisher of scientific mathematical literature, and SNS-B, an independent postgraduate-level teaching initiative to guide towards research the best Romanian students.

The Institute is located on Calea Griviței Street, in the Sector 1 of Bucharest; it occupies the same downtown building it had before 1975.

== Directors ==
- Dimitrie Pompeiu, 1945–1954
- Simion Stoilow, 1954–1961
- Miron Nicolescu, 1961–1973
- Romulus Cristescu, 1973–1975
- Gheorghe Gussi, 1990–1999
- Șerban Basarab, 1999–2004
- Vasile Brînzănescu, 2004–2012
- Lucian Beznea, 2012–
