= University of Bucharest =

Public university in Bucharest, Romania

- Universitatea din București
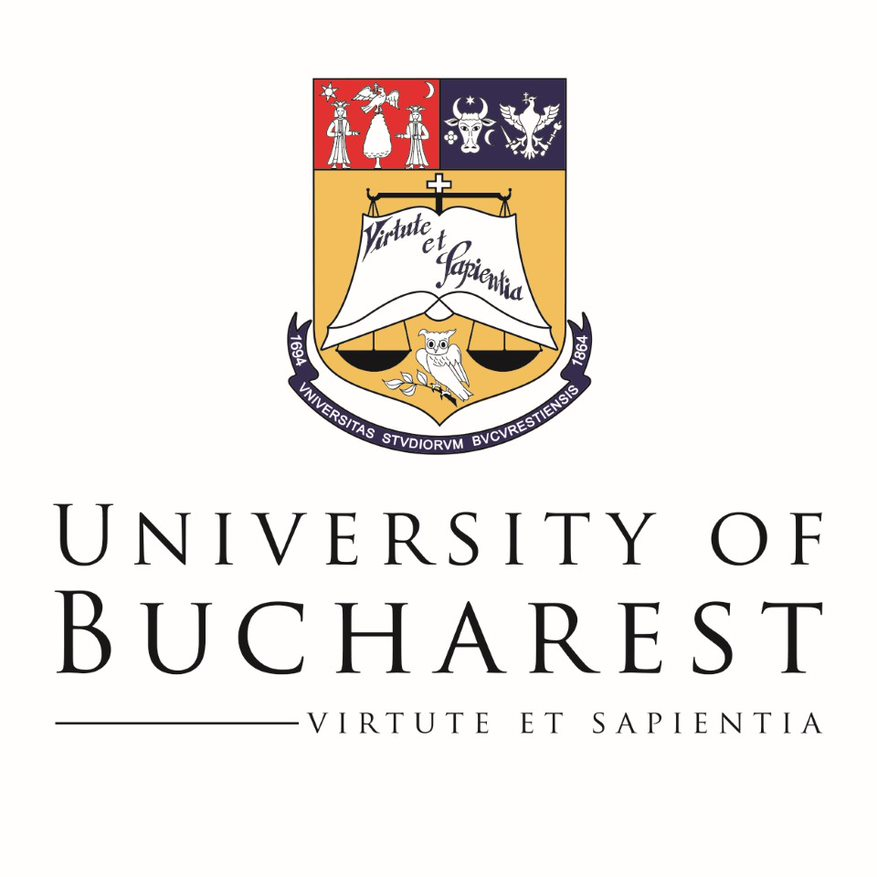
- Latin: Universitas Studiorum Bucurestiensis
- Other names: UB, UniBuc
- Motto: Virtute et Sapientia (Latin)
- Motto in English: Virtue and Wisdom
- Type: Public
- Established: 1694 – Princely Academy of Bucharest; 1821 – Saint Sava College; 4 July 1864; 162 years ago
- Academic affiliations: IAU, UNICA, EUA, CIVIS
- Endowment: RON 1.14 billion (US$274.76 million) (2018)
- Budget: RON 364.7 million (US$87.67 million) (2018)
- Rector: Marian Preda
- Faculty: 1,300 (2022)
- Students: 32,576 (2022–2023)
- Undergraduates: 22,428 (2022–2023)
- Postgraduates: 8,911 (2022–2023)
- Location: Bucharest, Romania; 44°26′8.00″N 26°6′4.02″E
- Campus: Urban
- Colors: navy blue
- Website: unibuc.ro

The University of Bucharest (UB) (Romanian: Universitatea din București) is a public research university in Bucharest, Romania. It was founded in its current form on 4 July 1864 (162 years ago) by a decree of Prince Alexandru Ioan Cuza to convert the former Princely Academy into the current University of Bucharest, making it one of the oldest Romanian universities. It is one of the five members of the Universitaria Consortium (a group of elite Romanian universities).

The University of Bucharest offers study programmes in Romanian and English and is classified as an advanced research and education university by the Ministry of Education.

== History ==
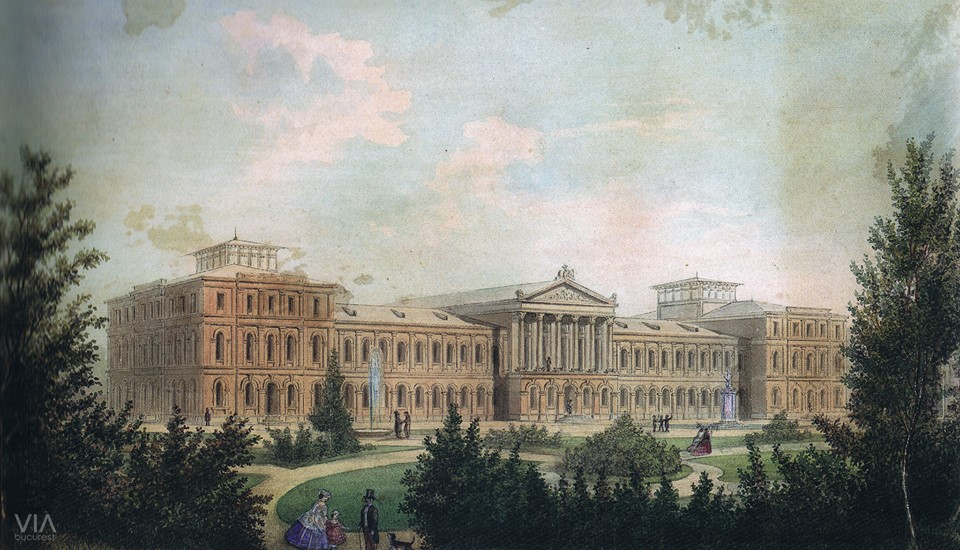
The original 1857 university main building, by Alexandru Orăscu

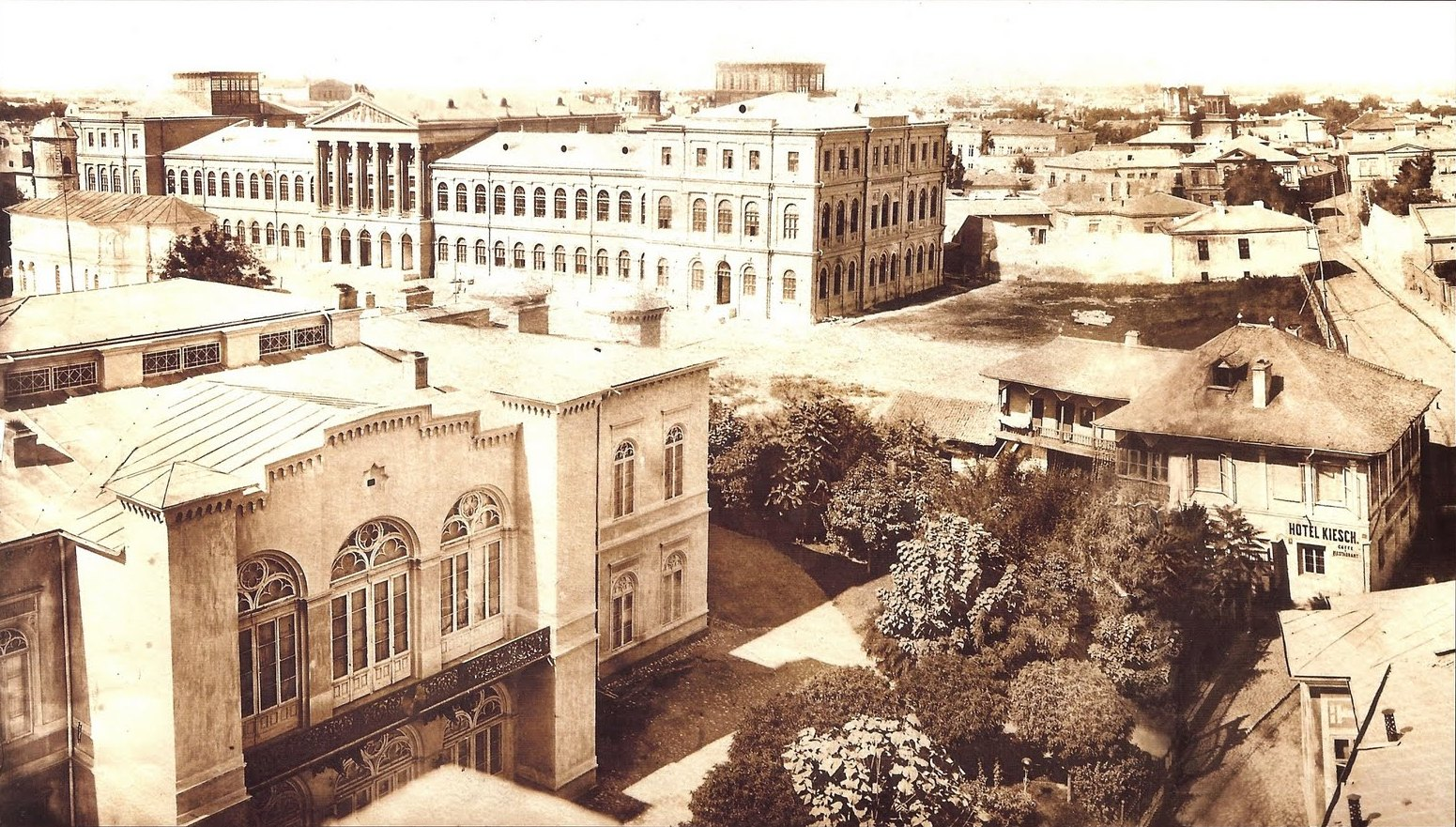
Photograph from 1864 by Carol Szathmari

The University of Bucharest was founded by the Decree no. 765 of 4 July 1864 by Prince Alexandru Ioan Cuza and is a leading academic centre and a significant point of reference in society.

The University of Bucharest is rich in history and has been actively contributing to the development and modernization of Romanian education, science, and culture since 1694. In 1694 Constantin Brâncoveanu, ruler of Wallachia, had founded the Princely Academy in Bucharest with lectures delivered in Greek. In 1776, Alexander Ypsilantis, ruler of Wallachia, reformed the curriculum of the Princely Academy, where courses of French, Italian, and Latin were now taught. After 1821, the Princely Academy was continued by the Saint Sava College. In 1857, Carol Davila and Nicolae Kretzulescu created the National School of Medicine and Pharmacy. In 1859, the Faculty of Law was created.

In 1857, the foundation stone of the University Palace in Bucharest was laid.

On 4/16 July 1864, Prince Alexandru Ioan Cuza established the University of Bucharest, bringing together the Faculties of Law, Sciences and Letters as one single body. In 1869, the Faculty of Medicine is created through the transformation of the National School of Medicine and Pharmacy. In the following years, new faculties were created: 1884 – the Faculty of Theology; 1906 – the Institute of Geology; 1913 – the Academic Institute for Electrotechnology; 1921 – the Faculty of Veterinary Medicine; 1923 – the Faculty of Pharmacy, 1924 – the Mina Minovici Institute of Forensic Medicine.

In 1956, student leaders, mainly from this university, planned a peaceful protest against Romania's Communist regime but were forcibly prevented from carrying it out. (See Bucharest student movement of 1956).

For a while (in the 1950s and early 1960s), it was called the "C. I. Parhon University", after Constantin Ion Parhon.

Most of the building is still intact, however during the bombardments of Bucharest in 1944, the central corpus of the building was heavily damaged and demolished due to Luftwaffe bombs, and was only re-constructed in 1969–1971. Other sections were also completed by 1980.

The area around the old University building (the University Square), adjacent to the C. A. Rosetti, Roman, Kogălniceanu, and Union squares was the scene of many riots, protests and clashes with the security forces during the Romanian Revolution of 1989. During the months of April–June 1990, the University of Bucharest was the centre of anti-communist protests.

In 1996, Emil Constantinescu, the then rector of the University of Bucharest, was elected President of Romania, after defeating Ion Iliescu in the 1996 Romanian presidential election.

== Organisation ==
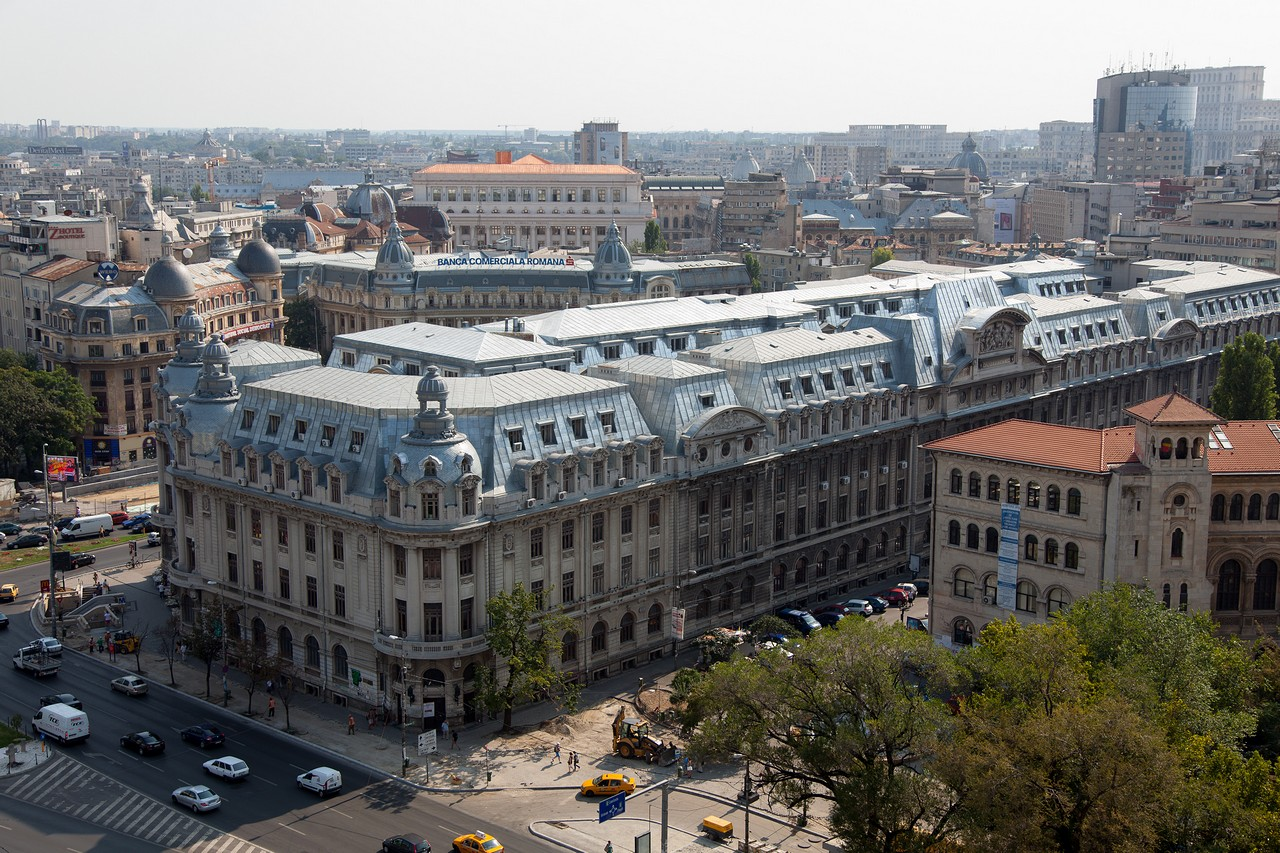
University Palace - the main building of the University of Bucharest

=== Faculties ===
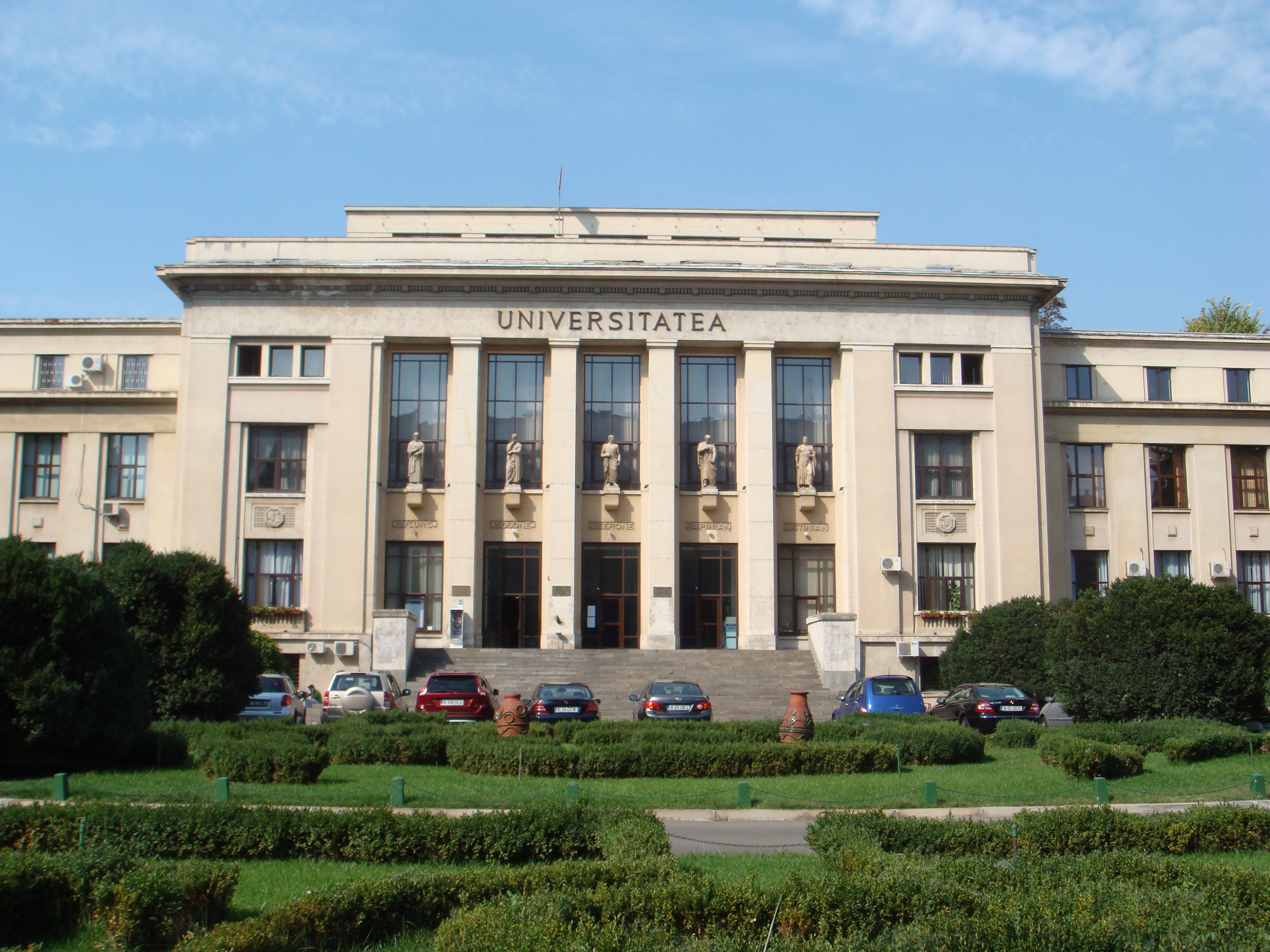
The Faculty of Law of The University of Bucharest

The University of Bucharest has 19 faculties, covering various fields such as natural sciences, humanities, social sciences, and theology:

- The Faculty of Business and Administration
- The Faculty of Biology
- The Faculty of Chemistry
- The Faculty of Law
- The Faculty of Interdisciplinary Studies
- The Faculty of Philosophy
- The Faculty of Physics
- The Faculty of Geography
- The Faculty of Geology and Geophysics
- The Faculty of History
- The Faculty of Journalism and Communication Studies
- The Faculty of Foreign Languages and Literatures
- The Faculty of Letters
- The Faculty of Mathematics and Computer Science
- The Faculty of Psychology and Education Sciences
- The Faculty of Sociology and Social Work
- The Faculty of Political Science
- The Faculty of Orthodox Theology
- The Faculty of Roman Catholic Theology
- The Faculty of Baptist Theology

=== Academic & research units ===
The university has the following five interdisciplinary departments:

- Technology Department
- Distance Learning Department
- UNESCO Department for intercultural and interreligious exchanges
- Department of Education Pedagogy
- Francophone Doctoral School of Social Sciences (French: École Doctorale Francophone de l'Europe Centrale et de Sud-Est)

The university also has a publishing house, different research institutes and research groups (such as the Institute for Political Research, the Institute for Mathematics, the Center for Byzantine Studies, the Vasile Pârvan Archeology Seminary, the Center for Nuclear Research, etc.), master and doctorate programmes, and a number of lifelong learning facilities and programmes. It has partnership agreements with over 50 universities in 40 countries, and participates in European programmes such as ERASMUS, Lingua, Naric, Leonardo da Vinci, UNICA, AMOS, TEMPUS, TEMPRA. It is an accredited Cisco Academy, has Microsoft curriculum, and is accredited by Red Hat for its academic programme.

== Campus ==
The University of Bucharest has a number of buildings throughout Bucharest, so in that respect it does not have a single campus. Its two main buildings are:

- The Old Building, in the University Square (practically right in the center of the city), housing the Faculties of Mathematics and Computer Science, History, Chemistry, Geography, Letters and the Department of Romance Languages and Literatures.
- Palace of the Faculty of Law, near the Opera House, housing the Faculty of Law.

Other faculties have their own buildings and research facilities, scattered throughout the city, such as:

- The Departments of Germanic, Slavic and Oriental Languages and Literatures, on Pitar Moș Street.
- The Faculty of Physics, in the small town of Măgurele, situated 16 km (9.9 mi) south of Bucharest.
- The Faculty of Biology, on Splaiul Independenței.
- The Faculty of Philosophy, on [:ro:Splaiul Independenței]Splaiul Independenței.
- The Faculty of Psychology, on Șoseaua Panduri.
- The Faculty of Political Science, on Spiru Haret Street.
- The Faculty of Orthodox Theology, on Bibescu Voda Street, near Unirii Square.
- The Faculty of Roman Catholic Theology, on General Berthelot Street.
- The Faculty of Baptist Theology, on Berzei Street.
- The Faculty of Interdisciplinary Studies, on Transilvania Street.

The university prints an annual guide for freshmen.

== Rankings ==
University rankings

Global – Overall
- QS World: 761–770 (2026)
- THE World: 1001–1200 (2026)
- USNWR Global: =980 (2026)

In the 2012 QS World University Rankings, the University of Bucharest was included in the Top 601-701 universities of the world, together with three other Romanian universities, including Babeș-Bolyai University in Cluj-Napoca, and Alexandru Ioan Cuza University in Iași.

The University of Bucharest has been awarded the 2000 National Academic Excellence Diploma, and the 2004 National Academic Excellence Medal. All of the degrees and diplomas awarded by the university are internationally recognised.

== Affiliations ==
The University of Bucharest is a member of numerous international organisations and partnerships, including:

- The Association of Universities in European Capitals (UNICA)
- The Network of South-East European Universities
- The European University Association (EUA)
- Agence Universitaire de la Francophonie (AUF)
- Black Sea Universities Network (BSUN)
- Academic Cooperation Association (ACA)
- European Inter-University Centre for Human Rights and Democratization (EIUC)
- Eurasian Universities Union (EURAS)
- SEE GRID - South-East Europe GRID - 2005
- Central European Exchange Program for University Studies (CEEPUS)
- ERASMUS NETWORK EUE-NET
- Educational Structure in Europe, Phase IV (TUNING)
- European Physics Education Network (EUPEN)
- Stakeholders Tune European Physics Studies (STEPS)

As part of the on-going ERASMUS programme, the University of Bucharest has approximately 225 Erasmus agreements with European partner universities.

== Academic staff, alumni, and rectors ==
=== Past and present faculty ===
- Ion Barbu, also known as Dan Barbilian – mathematician and poet
- Grigore Brâncuș - linguist
- Silviu Brucan – political analyst and author
- Matilda Caragiu Marioțeanu – linguist
- George Călinescu – writer and literary critic
- Mircea Cărtărescu – Postmodern writer
- Emil Constantinescu – 3rd President of Romania
- Petru Creția – philologist
- Neagu Djuvara – historian
- Alexandru Graur – linguist
- Aristide Halanay – mathematician
- Spiru Haret – mathematician, astronomer and politician
- Eugène Ionesco – Romanian-French playwright widely considered the most important of the 20th century
- Iorgu Iordan – linguist
- Nicolae Iorga – historian, literary critic, and politician
- Traian Lalescu – mathematician
- Gabriel Liiceanu – philosopher
- Titu Maiorescu – literary critic
- Nicolae Manolescu – author and literary critic
- Solomon Marcus – mathematician
- Adrian Năstase – politician
- Miron Nicolescu – mathematician
- Bogdan Petriceicu Hasdeu – writer and philologist
- Dimitrie Pompeiu – mathematician
- Alexandru Rosetti – linguist
- Ion Th. Simionescu – geologist
- Simion Stoilow – mathematician
- Nicolae Titulescu – politician
- Tudor Vianu – literary critic, philosopher
- Dan-Virgil Voiculescu – mathematician
- Gheorghe Vrânceanu – mathematician
- Romulus Cristescu - mathematician

=== Alumni ===
- Zicu Araia – poet, schoolteacher and Aromanian separatist (did not graduate)
- Albert-László Barabási – physicist
- Nineta Barbulescu – career diplomat, ambassador
- Ismat Beg – mathematician
- Leon Boga – writer, schoolteacher and archivist
- Gheorghe I. Cantacuzino – archeologist
- Matilda Caragiu Marioțeanu – linguist
- Hristu Cândroveanu – editor, literary critic and writer
- Mircea Cărtărescu – postmodern writer
- George Ceara – poet and prose writer (did not graduate)
- Zoia Ceaușescu – mathematician, daughter of Nicolae Ceaușescu
- Alexandrina Cernov – academic, literary historian and philologist
- Emil Cioran – essayist and philosopher
- Ecaterina Ciorănescu-Nenițescu – chemist
- George Ciucu – mathematician
- Daniel Dines - billionaire entrepreneur, and the co-founder and CEO of UiPath
- Iosif Constantin Drăgan – businessman, writer, and historian
- Mircea Eliade – historian of religion, fiction writer, philosopher, and professor at the University of Chicago
- Nicholas Georgescu-Roegen – economist
- Viviana Gradinaru – Professor of Neuroscience at Caltech
- Eugen Filotti – diplomat
- Horia Hulubei – physicist
- Grigore Iunian – politician
- Traian Lalescu – mathematician
- Stoica Lascu – historian
- Gheorghe Mihoc – mathematician
- Grigore Moisil – mathematician and computer scientist
- Miron Nicolescu – mathematician
- Luca Niculescu – journalist and diplomat
- Constantin Noe – editor and professor
- Ștefan Odobleja – scientist, one of the precursors of cybernetics
- Octav Onicescu – mathematician
- George Emil Palade – cell biologist, 1974 Nobel Prize laureate
- Nicolae Paulescu – Romanian physiologist, professor of medicine, missed the Nobel Prize 1923 for discovering insulin
- Eleni Papadopulos-Eleopulos – nuclear physicist and AIDS denialist
- Georgiana Catalina Popescu – Romanian lawyer, model, and beauty queen
- Andrei Pleșu – philosopher, essayist, journalist, literary and art critic, and politician
- Dorin N. Poenaru – nuclear physicist
- Valentin Poénaru – mathematician
- Victor Ponta – former Prime Minister of Romania
- Constantin Rădulescu-Motru – psychologist and sociologist
- Mihail Sadoveanu – writer
- Ahmad Maher Abul Samen – Jordanian Minister of Public Works and Housing and Minister of Transport
- Nicolae Saramandu – linguist and philologist
- George Simion – politician and activist
- Horia Sima – leader of the Iron Guard and co-leader of the National Legionary State
- Ruxandra Sireteanu – neuroscientist
- Bogdan Suceavă – mathematician and writer
- Nicolae Șerban Tanașoca – historian and philologist
- Gheorghe Tașcă – economist
- Nicolas Trifon – academic, editor and linguist
- Șerban Țițeica – physicist
- Radu Vasile – politician and poet
- Dan-Virgil Voiculescu – mathematician
- Ioanna Andreesco, writer and anthropologist

=== Rectors ===
- Gheorghe Costaforu (1864–1871)
- Vasile Boerescu (1871)
- Ioan Zalomit (1871–1885)
- Alexandru Orăscu (1885–1892)
- Titu Maiorescu (1892–1897)
- Grigoriu Ștefănescu (1897–1898)
- Constantin Dimitrescu-Iași (1898–1911)
- Ermil Pangrati (1911–1912)
- Ioan Bogdan (1912)
- Thoma Ionescu (1912–1915)
- Ioan Athanasiu (1915–1920)
- Mihail Vlădescu (1920–1923)
- Ermil Pangrati (1923–1929)
- Nicolae Iorga (1929–1932)
- Nicolae Gheorghiu (1932–1936)
- Constantin C. Stoicescu (1936–1940)
- Petre P. Panaitescu (1940–1941)
- Alexandru Otetelișanu (1941)
- Horia Hulubei (1941–1944)
- Daniel Danielopolu (1944)
- Simion Stoilow (1944–1946)
- Alexandru Rosetti (1946–1949)
- Ilie G. Murgulescu (1949–1950)
- Constantin Balmuș (1950–1952)
- Avram Bunaciu (1952–1954)
- Nicolae Sălăgeanu (1954–1957)
- Iorgu Iordan (1957–1958)
- Jean Livescu (1959–1963)
- Gheorghe Mihoc (1963–1968)
- Jean Livescu (1968–1972)
- George Ciucu (1972–1981)
- Ioan-Ioviț Popescu (1981–1988)
- Ion Dodu Bălan (1989)
- Nicolaie D. Cristescu (1990–1992)
- Emil Constantinescu (1992–1996)
- Ioan Mihăilescu (1996–2005)
- Ioan Pânzaru (2005–2012)
- Mircea Dumitru (2012–2019)
- Marian Preda (2019–Present)

== See also ==
- List of modern universities in Europe (1801–1945)
