= Dan Grigore =

Romanian classical pianist

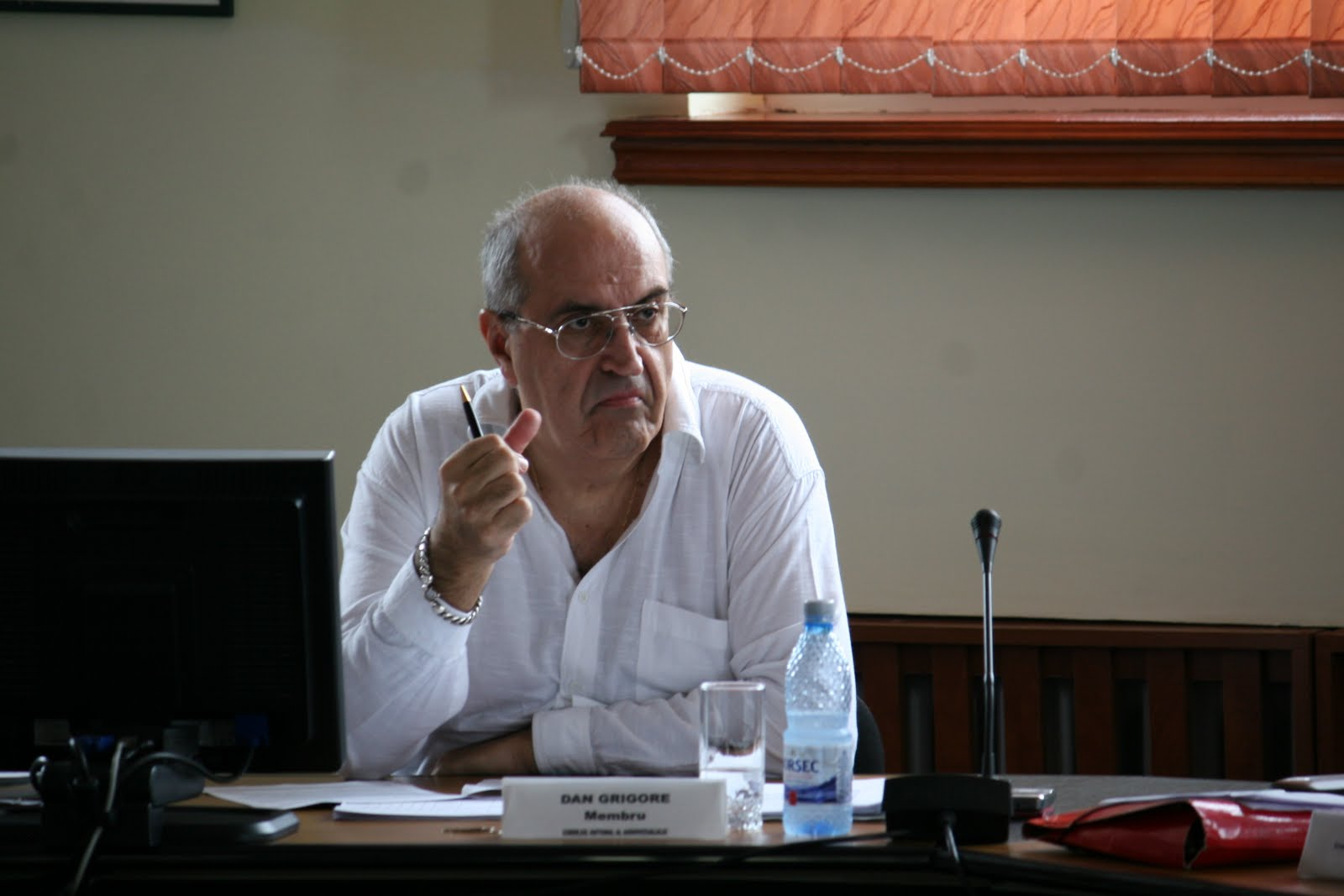

Background information
- Born: 6 August 1943; Bucharest, Romania
- Genres: Classical music
- Occupation: Pianist
- Instrument: Piano
- Years active: 1957 - present (61 years)

Dan Grigore (born 6 August 1943) is a Romanian classical pianist. He is regarded as one of the great pianists of the twentieth century.

== Early life ==
Dan Grigore was born in 1943 in Bucharest, Romania. His father, Nicolae Grigore, was a fighter pilot in the Romanian Air Force and a World War II hero (subsequently promoted to general); one street in Bucharest is named after him. His mother, Polixenia (née Cosîmbescu) was a housewife.

Grigore took his first music lessons with his mother, who had studied violin in her teens. At the age of three, he began to play his own compositions. In 1949, at six, he started private piano lessons with Eugenia Ionescu, a famous teacher of her time who had studied at Leipzig with Robert Teichmüller and Max Reger. She immediately realized that the child had absolute pitch. Eugenia Ionescu used to hold musical soirees in her home, where she would invite famous pianists and teachers of the time to listen to him, including Florica Musicescu, Cella Delavrancea, Constanța Erbiceanu, Muza Ciomac, Silvia Șerbescu, Nadia Chebap, and Madeleine Cocorăscu, among others. It soon became clear that Grigore was a child prodigy. It was during these musical soirees that Dan Grigore was discovered by the famous composer and professor Mihail Jora (member of the Romanian Academy), a close friend of George Enescu and former teacher of Dinu Lipatti.

Around 1955, Grigore's family was in deep financial trouble following the Soviet occupation of Romania (August 23, 1944). After the Romanian Communist Party's rise to power (by frauding the 1946 general elections) and the forced abdication at gunpoint of King Michael I of Romania, Grigore's father had been stripped of all his military decorations and dismissed from the army during the great Communist purge of the 1950s. Also, Grigore's maternal grandfather had been sent to prison and lost his pension for sending a letter to the American Embassy in which he had described the abuses of the Communist regime. Given the family's hardship and the child's unusual talent, Mihail Jora (although in financial trouble himself due to similar political reasons) generously offered to give Grigore private lessons free of charge, which he did for the next seven years (between 1955-1962). Jora had great admiration for his young student. In a reference sent to the Ministry of Culture, he stated, "Dan Grigore is an exceptional talent which all the so-called 'great Romanian talents' bear no comparison to". This resulted in a special scholarship (1955-1958) awarded by the Romanian Composers' Association.

In 1957, the fourteen-year-old Grigore made his first appearance on stage with three recently discovered works of George Enescu in first world audition (Chorale, Burlesque, and Carillon nocturne from the Piano Suite no. 3 Pièces impromptues, Op. 18).

Between 1958-1962 Dan Grigore also studied with the famous professor Florica Musicescu, former teacher of Dinu Lipatti. During this time, he received a special scholarship from George Enescu's widow, Princess Maria Cantacuzino, who granted him personal use of the great composer's piano for five years.

== Education and career ==
In 1962, on the recommendation of his two mentors, Florica Musicescu and Mihail Jora, Grigore was awarded a five-year scholarship at the Saint Petersburg Conservatory (Prof. Tatiana Kravchenko). The close encounter with the Russian music, literature, and society proved crucial for the young pianist. It was also during this time that he first attended live performances of Sviatoslav Richter, Aldo Ciccolini, and Arturo Benedetti Michelangeli. However, the personality clash with Kravchenko (despite his excellent student record), combined with the extremely poor living conditions in the student facilities of the Soviet Union (extreme cold, lack of hot running water, poor food, disease, and lack of private access to a piano) ultimately made him drop the five-year scholarship after completing the first two years in 1964. He received full scholarship and transferred (as a third-year student) to the Bucharest Conservatory, from which he graduated first in his class in 1967.

In 1968, the famous professor and conductor Nadia Boulanger offered Grigore a full scholarship at the American Conservatory in Fontainebleau, which was denied by the Romanian Communist regime. In 1969, Jora won the Herder Prize and nominated Grigore for the Herder one-year scholarship at the Vienna Academy of Music (under the supervision of the revered professor Richard Hauser). Hauser was so impressed with the young pianist that in 1970 he attempted to secure a one-year extension for Grigore's scholarship. The project never came to fruitition because of Hauser's death.

== Notable recordings ==
- 1987 - Schumann, Piano Concerto in A minor, with Emil Simon and the Cluj-Napoca Philharmonic
- 1987 - Beethoven, Piano Concerto No. 5 (Beethoven), with Emil Simon and the Cluj-Napoca Philharmonic
- 1987 - Grieg, Piano Concerto in A minor, with Emil Simon and the Cluj-Napoca Philharmonic
- 1987 - Tchaikovsky, Piano Concerto No. 1 (Tchaikovsky), with Cristian Mandeal and the Cluj-Napoca Philharmonic
- ???? - Brahms, Piano Concerto No. 1 (Brahms), with Mihai Brediceanu and the "George Enescu" Philharmonic

== Honours ==
- Knight of the Order of Arts and Letters, France (1999)
- Grand Cross of the National Order of Faithful Service, Romania (2000)
- Doctor Honoris Causa, George Enescu National University of Arts, Iași, Romania (2005)
- Grand Cross of the National Order of the Star of Romania, Romania (2007)
- Royal Decoration of the Cross of the Romanian Royal House, Romania (2008)
- Royal Decoration of Nihil Sine Deo, Romania (2013)
- Pianist of the Royal House of Romania, Romania (2013)
