= Brediceanu =

Brediceanu, a Romanian-language surname, may refer to:

- Caius Brediceanu (1879–1953), Romanian politician and diplomat
- Coriolan Brediceanu (1849–1909), Austro-Hungarian Romanian lawyer and politician
- Mihai Brediceanu (1920–2005), Romanian composer and, conductor
- Tiberiu Brediceanu (1877–1968), Romanian composer
