= Liana Șerbescu =

Musician

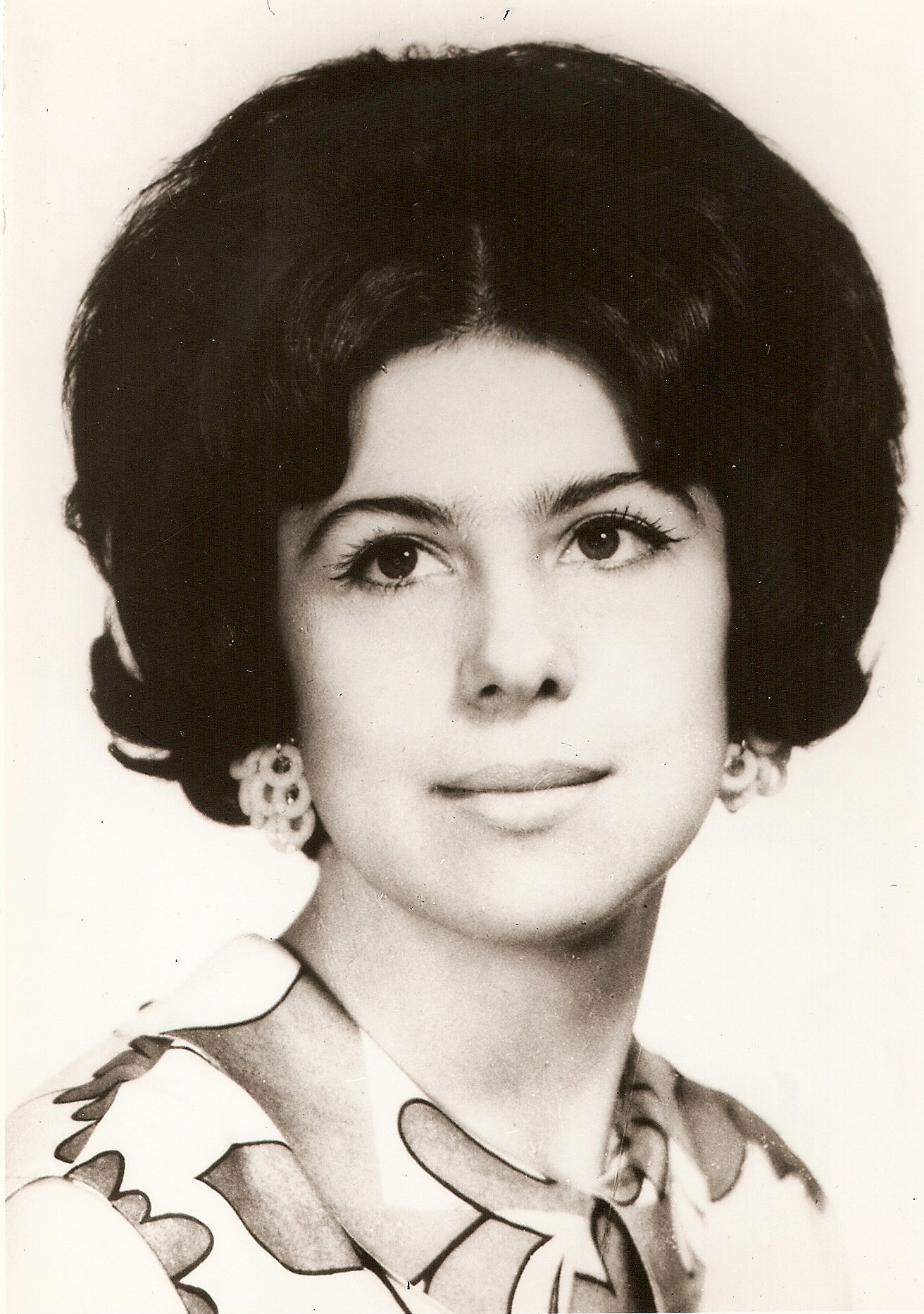
- Liana Șerbescu in 1968
- Born: 25 August 1934 (age 91); Bucharest, Romania
- Occupations: Pianist, music pedagogue

Liana Șerbescu (born 25 August 1934), is a Romanian pianist, piano pedagogue and musicologist, a pioneer in the field of women's music. Through her many-sided activity as a performing pianist, researcher and writer, she contributed to enriching the repertoire of classical piano music.

== Biography ==
Liana Șerbescu was born in Bucharest to engineer Florian Șerbescu and pianist Silvia Chelaru-Șerbescu. Her mother's family counted several generations of musicians and composers. Liana studied with several well-known Romanian teachers: Constanța Erbiceanu, Cella Delavrancea, Dagobert Buchholz and Silvia Serbescu, at the Bucharest Music Conservatory, and later with Guido Agosti at the Accademia Musicale Chigiana in Siena. A winner of three National Young Pianists Competitions (1953, 1955 and 1957), she performed with all the Romanian orchestras. She has toured in France, Germany, the Soviet Union, China, Czechoslovakia, Hungary, Poland, Yugoslavia, Bulgaria, Norway, Sweden, Italy, England, Spain, the Netherlands and the US, and collaborated, among others, with the Orchestre des Concerts Lamoureux, the Stockholm Philharmonic, the Zagreb Radio and TV Orchestra, the Prague Symphony Orchestra, the Münchener Kammeroper Orchestra and the Syracuse Symphony Orchestra (USA). Liana Serbescu played under the baton of Charles Dutoit, Vaclav Smetacek, Sergiu Comissiona, Erich Bergel, Lawrence Foster, Emil Simon, Renard Czajkowski, Daniel Chabrun, Eugène Bozza, Itay Talgam, Claire Gibault, Mihai Brediceanu, and Mircea Cristescu.

In December 1974 Șerbescu left communist Romania and, following brief stays in Norway and Sweden, settled in the Netherlands. Following her illegal emigration, all her recordings were deleted from the Romanian Radio and Television phonoteque, and her name no longer appeared in any publication – not even in the monograph on Silvia Șerbescu by Iosif Sava and Florian Șerbescu. She worked for 22 years as a piano teacher at the "Brabants Conservatorium" of the Tilburg Katholieke Leergangen University. However, her main activity was the promotion of the work of women composers. Her most notable achievement in this field was the first recording, on two CDs, of Fanny Mendelssohn Hensel's hitherto unknown Piano Sonatas and of the piano cycle "The Year" (1986–1987). In addition, she edited in collaboration with Barbara Heller the first publication of those works (Furore Verlag, 1989). Another significant contribution to the piano repertoire was Liana Șerbescu's discovery of Ethel Smyth's piano music at the British Library Manuscripts Department, that she subsequently recorded on a double CD by CPO (1995) and edited at the prestigious publishers Breitkopf & Härtel (2001–2002)

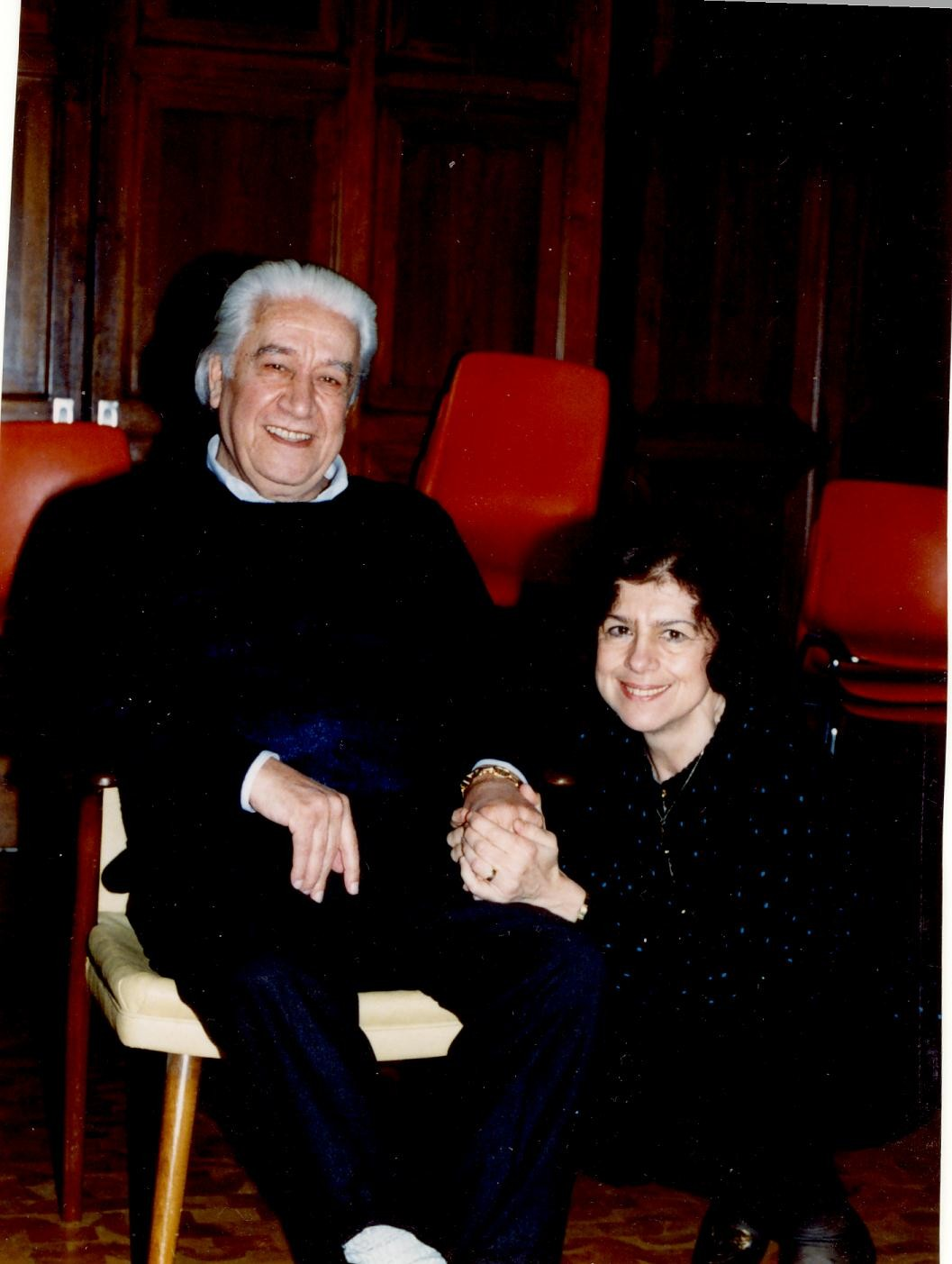
Liana Șerbescu with Sergiu Celibidache at the University of Mainz for his master class on Phenomenology, April 1991

In 1980 she performed at the Bonn First International Festival of Women Composers Clara Schumann's Piano Concerto with the French conductor Claire Gibault. Subsequently, she often performed in Germany and the Netherlands with the Köln "Clara Schumann" Women's Orchestra led by Elke Mascha Blankenburg. After the 1989 Romanian Revolution she resumed playing in Romania. The composer Boldizsár Csiky greeted her return with the words: "After 18 years of absence, together we cheer: Welcome home!"

Liana Șerbescu was married from 1965 to 1998 to the theoretical physicist Mihai Gavrilă, with whom she has two children: Ioa-Silva Gavrilă and Dariu Mihai Gavrilă.

== Repertoire ==
In addition to the standard classical and romantic repertoire, her programs often included all-Bach piano recitals and 20th century music, for which she had a special affinity. Bartók’s Piano Concerto no.1, Stravinsky’s Concerto for Piano and Wind Instruments and "The Four Temperaments" for piano and orchestra by Paul Hindemith were given their Romanian premieres by Liana Serbescu. She also premiered in several countries piano works by Romanian composers and recorded them for radio broadcasts. In 1976 she premiered in Osnabruck Alfred Böckmann's Concerto for Piano and Orchestra.

Music by women composers, spanning four centuries, had a special and consistent place in her repertoire. She played Clara Schumann's Piano Concerto with several orchestras, as well as solo pieces by various women composers, some of which were dedicated to her.

== Recordings ==
1. Fanny Mendelssohn-Hensel, Klavierwerke Vol. I – Das Jahr (World premiere CD recording), CPO Recordings (CPO 999 013-2), Osnabrück, 1986.
2. Fanny Mendelssohn-Hensel, Klavierwerke Vol. II – Sonatas (World premiere CD recording), Lieder, CPO Recordings (CPO 999 015-2), Osnabrück, 1987
3. Clara Wieck-Schumann, 7 Variationen über ein Thema von Robert Schumann, Op. 20; – Romanze in B minor, Piano Concerto, Op. 7, Clara Schumann Orchestra, Elke Mascha Blankenburg, conductor, Deutsche Bundesbank, Frankfurt – Deutschlandfunk, Köln, 1990 (MMS 9005).
4. Ethel Smyth, Complete Piano Works, (CD I and II), CPO Recordings (CPO 999 327-2), Osnabrück, 1995.
5. Liana Serbescu, Pagini musicale din cariera pianistei [=musical pages from the pianist's career]. CD 1: Solo piano pieces; CD 2: Concertos for piano and orchestra, Electrecord (EDC 1089-1090), Romania, 2013.
6. George Enescu, Muzică de camera de George Enescu în Olanda [=Chamber Music in Holland] (with Michel François, violin and György Schiffer, cello), Electrecord (EDC 1091), Romania, 2013.
7. Liana Serbescu Compozitoare de-a lungul secolelor prezentate de — [=Presents Women Composers through the Centuries] (2 CDs), Electrecord (EDC 1106/1107), 2014.
8. Silvia și Liana Șerbescu in concert (2 CDs), Electrecord (EDC 1108/1109), 2014.
9. Beethoven • Vieru • Zoltán, JEUX, Electrecord (EDC 1158), 2019.

== Publications ==
=== Critical editions of piano music edited by Liana Serbescu (first publications) ===
- Fanny Hensel (born Mendelssohn), Das Jahr, vol I and II, Furore Verlag, 1989.
- Fanny Hensel (born Mendelssohn), Das Jahr, vol I and II, (revised edition), Furore Verlag, 1998.
- Fanny Hensel, Sonate in c minor, Sonatensatz in E-major, Furore Verlag, 1991.
- Fanny Hensel, Sonate in g-minor, Furore Verlag, 1991.
- Ethel Smyth, Complete Piano Works, vol. I, Breitkopf & Härtel, 2002.
- Ethel Smyth, Complete Piano Works, vol. II, Breitkopf & Härtel, 2001.
- Barbara Heller, Sonatine for Piano, (with a preface by Liana Serbescu) Ed. Schott, Mainz, 2005.

=== Articles ===
- "The Year in the life of Fanny Mendelssohn" ("Das Jahr in het leven van Fanny Mendelssohn"), Piano Bulletin, 21–32, Nederland, 1988.
- "Clara Haskil" (1895–1995), Roemenië Bulletin, 25–27, April 1995, Nederland.
- "Ethel Smyth's Piano Music", Piano Journal, 11–15, Nov. 1995, London.
- "The Odyssey of a publication - The first edition of Ethel Smyth's complete piano music" ("De Odyssee van een Publicatie"), Piano Bulletin, 40–49, 2001, Nederland.
- "Songs without Words: Fanny Mendelssohn's Bicentenary", Piano Journal, Summer 2005, London.
- Fanny Hensel, a Bicentennial Celebration, EPTA International Conference Manchester, 2005.
- Ulla Levens, Begegnungen mit Barbara Heller,107-109 ("Geschichte einer Freundschaft"), Wolke Verlag, Hofheim, 2006.
- "Robert and Clara Schumann and their dreamland Atlantis", Piano Bulletin, 29–41, Nederland, 2006.
- Spiritual Relations between Robert and Clara Schumann, International EPTA Conference, Czech Republic, 2006.
- "Farewell to Robert: Variations on a Theme by Him, by Clara Schumann and Johannes Brahms", Piano Journal, 11–16, Summer 2006.
- About Love and Death in Ethel Smyth's Early Piano Creation, International Ethel Smyth Symposium, Detmold, 2008.
- Les Innocentes by Anna de Noailles, or How I Started to Love Ethel Smyth's Piano Music, International Ethel Smyth Symposium, Oxford, 2008.
- "Codes, ciphers and hidden clues in Schumann's Piano Music", Piano Journal, 14–20, London, 2010.
- "A secret history - the compositions of women composers through the centuries", Studii de Muzicologie vol.XII, 215–225, Ed. Artes, Iasi, 2017.
- "Enigma Alexandru Hrisanide", Studii de Muzicologie vol. XIV, 196–207, Ed. Artes, Iasi, 2019.
- "Tinerețe fără bătrânețe: Compozitorul Alexandru Hrisanide (15 iunie 1936 – 19 noiembrie 2018), Gânduri la intrarea lui în VIAȚA FĂRĂ DE MOARTE", in: Muzica, serie nouă, XXX 5 (2019), 39–56.

=== Booklets accompanying CDs ===
- Fanny Hensel, Piano Works, vol I (See Recording 1)
- Fanny Hensel, Piano Works, vol II (Recording 2)
- Ethel Smyth, Complete Piano Works (Recording 4)
- George Enescu's Chamber Music in Holland (Recording 6)
- Women Composers along the centuries (Recording 7)

=== Contributions to lexicons of women musicians ===
- Mascha Blankenburg, Dirigentinnen im 20. Jahrhundert. Porträts von Marin Alsop bis Simone Young, Europäische Verlagsanstalt/ Sabine Groenewold Verlage, Hamburg, 2003, pp. 8, 77–80, 244–245, 260, 264–265.
- Europäischer Dirigentinnenreader, Kassel, Furore Verlag, 2002. ISBN 3-927327-55-7. (Schriftenreihe Frau und Musik Internationaler Arbeitskreis e.V. Band 4), p. 28-29, 146–147.
- Isolde Weiermüller-Backes and Barbara Heller, Klaviermusik von Komponistinnen : vom 17. bis zum 21. Jahrhundert. Verzeichnis mit Hinweisen für den Unterricht, Staccato Verlag, Düsseldorf, 2003, pp. 58–59.
- Hinson, Maurice, & Wesley Roberts. - Guide to the Pianists Repertoire, 887, Indiana University Press, 2013

== Bibliography ==
- The World Who's Who of Women, fifth edition, 948–949, International Biographical Centre, Cambridge, England, 1980.
- Alexandrescu, Sorin. - "Muziek met een vrouwelijke toets – Een Interview met Liana Serbescu" (Music with a woman's touch), Roemenië Bulletin 30–35, Nederland, April 1996.
- Benkö, András. - Zene Tudományi Írások ("Studies in Musicology"), 185, Ed. Kriterion, Bukarest, 1980.
- Botta, Radu. - O viață între două lumi, interview Liana Șerbescu (A life between two worlds), Memoria, 18–26, Fundația Memoria, București, 2011.
- Coman, Lavinia. - Schiță de portret în mișcare – Liana Șerbescu,( A sketch of a portrait in motion), 82-105, Akade Musica 4, Ed. Universitatii nationale de Muzica Bucuresti, 2010
- Cosma, Octavian Lazar. - Simfonicele Radiodifuziunii Române, 281, 351, 707, 710, 718, 746, 750, 753, 755, Colectia Biblioteca Radio, Bucuresti, 1999.
- Cosma, Viorel. - Filarmonica "George Enescu" din Bucuresti (1868–1968), 257, 269, Bucharest, 1968.
- Geoldes, Avram, & Sándor Dénes. - Filarmonica de Stat din Oradea- 50 ani de activitate, 1949–1999, p. 41, Oradea, 1999.
- Giulvezan, Ovidiu. - Ecouri Muzicale Timisorene (1969–1996), 70–71,125, Ed. Brumar, Timișoara, 1996.
- Helmig, Martina. - Fanny Hensel, geb. Mendelssohn Bartholdy: das Werk, 1997, p. 183.
- Imbert, Catherine. - "Romanian Piano School", 107, 111, Piano nr.9, 1995–96.
- Kalmuski-Zarea, Ozana. – Jubileu 50, Monografia Filarmonicii "Mihail Jora", 59, 126, Edit. "Egal", Bacău, 2006.
- Koch, Paul-August. – Fanny Hensel geb. Mendelssohn – Kompositionen, 21, 24, 35, 46, Zimmermann – Frankfurt, 1993.
- Lelie, Christo. – "Onderzoek naar vrouwenmuziek: het belangrijkste in mijn zestigjarige beroepspraktijk – interview met Liana Șerbescu", Piano Bulletin 33 (2015), Nr. 1 (94), ISSN 0920-0983, p. 11-28.
- Râpeanu, Valeriu. – Oameni Iluștri, 259–268, Ed. Niculescu, București, 2009.
- Savinescu, Vasile. – Euterpe la Paralela 48 (Euterpe at parallel 48), 53–54, 142, Ed. Dacia, Cluj, 1999.
- Tomi, Ioan. – Filarmonica "Banatul" Timișoara, 50 ani de activitate, 1947–1997, pag. 99, Ed. Filarmonica "Banatul", Timișoara, 1997.
