= Paul Constantinescu =

Romanian composer

Paul Constantinescu (Romanian pronunciation: [ˈpa.ul konstantiˈnesku]; 30 June 1909, Ploiești – 20 December 1963) was a Romanian composer. Two of his main influences are Romanian folk music and Byzantine chant, both of which he used in his teaching. His students included Elise Popovici and Margareta Xenopol.

From 1928 to 1933 he studied at the Bucharest Conservatory (now known as the National University of Music Bucharest) with Castaldi, Jora, Cuclin and Brăiloiu, and then in Vienna from 1934 to 1935 with Schmidt and Marx. Returning to Bucharest, he taught from 1937 to 1941 at the Academy for Religious Music, and then from 1941 until his death was a professor of composition at the Conservatory. He received the Enescu prize in 1932, and the Romanian Academy prize in 1956.

Constantinescu used folk and liturgical elements in his works, with a strong command of form and modal harmony. He did much to pave the way for the post-Enescu generation of Romanian nationalist composers.

== Works ==
Dramatic

- O noapte furtunoasă, comic opera (1934; rev. 1950; Bucharest, May 19, 1951)
- Nunta în Carpați, choreographic poem (Bucharest, May 5, 1938)
- Pană Lesnea Rusalim, opera (1954–55, Cluj-Napoca, June 26, 1956).

Orchestral

- Suită românească (1930–36; rev. 1942)
- Jocuri românești (1936)
- Burlesca for Piano and Orch. (1937; Bucharest Radio, March 7, 1938)
- Simfonietă (1937; Bucharest Radio, March 16, 1938)
- Symphony No. 1 (1944; Bucharest, May 18, 1947; rev. 1955)
- Variațiuni libere asupra unei melodii bizantine din sec. XIII for Cello and Orch. (1946; rev. 1951)
- Concerto for Strings (1947; rev. 1955; Bucharest, Feb. 16, 1956)
- Rapsodia II (1949; Bucharest, Oct. 15, 1950)
- Baladă haiducească for Cello and Orch. (1950; Bucharest, Dec. 23, 1951)
- Suită bucovineană (1951)
- Piano Concerto (1952; Bucharest, May 16, 1953)
- Juventus, overture (1952)
- Rapsodie oltenească (1957)
- Violin Concerto (1957; Brasov, May 21, 1958)
- Înfrățire, choreographic rhapsody (Bucharest, Aug. 20, 1959)
- Harp Concerto (1960; Bucharest, May 4, 1961)
- Symphony No. 2, Simfonie ploieșteană (Ploiești, Sept. 29, 1961)
- Triple Concerto for Violin, Cello, Piano, and Orch. (Bucharest, Dec. 28, 1963).

CHAMBER and INSTRUMENTAL:

- Studii ȋn stil bizantin for Violin, Viola, and Cello (1929)
- Quintet (1932)
- Violin Sonatina (1933)
- Sonata bizantină for Solo Cello or Viola (1940)
- Cîntec vechi pe 2 melodii din Anton Pann for Cello and Piano (1952)
- piano pieces.

VOCAL:

- Isarlik for Soprano and Orch. (1936)
- Ryga Crypto și Lapona Enigel for Soli, Reciter, and Orch. (1936; rev. 1951; Bucharest, June 1, 1966)
- Byzantinisches Passions und Osteroratorium for Soli, Chorus, and Orch. (1943; Bucharest, March 3, 1946; rev. 1948)
- Byzantinisches Weihnachtoratorium for Soli, Chorus, and Orch. (Bucharest, Dec. 21, 1947)
- Ulița noastră, 7 songs for Baritone and orch. (1960)
- other songs.

== Recordings ==
- Violin concerto (Olympia, OCD417, released 1991), with works by Nichifor (Symph. 4) and Toduță (Tablatura for Lute)
- Ballad of the Outlaw for cello and orchestra, Concerto for Strings, Byzantine variations for cello and orchestra, Concerto for Harp (Olympia, OCD415)

Played by the Romanian State Philharmonic Orchestra/conductor: Ion Baciu (Both recordings are re-issues of LPs on the Electrecord label)

- Piano concerto (1952) and the Symphony No. 1 (1955 - a revised version of the 1944 symphony) on Olympia OCD 411 (released in 1991) — played by the Cluj "Transilvania" Philharmonic Orchestra with conductor Emil Simon and pianist Valentin Gheorghiu (again a re-issue of an Electrecord recording)
- Suite for piano (No. 1 Joc, No. 2 Cantec, No. 3 Joc dobrogean) (1952) played by pianists Dana Ciocarlie [on label Empreinte ED13122 (2000), with piano works by Enescu, Bartók], and Mihaela Ursuleasa (on label Berlin Classics in 2011)
- The Nativity (Byzantine Christmas Oratorio) (1947) performed by the Bucharest "George Enescu" Choir and Philharmonic Orchestra on label: Olympia OCD 402 and Electrocord Romania EDC 391
- Passion and Resurrection (Byzantine Easter Oratorio) (1946) performed by the Bucharest "Corul Academic Radio" and "Orchestra Națională Radio" on Editura Casa Radio ECR 293 (2011)

== Bibliography ==
- Hârlav-Maistorovici, Sanda (2015): „Creația componistică a lui Paul Constaninescu. Catalog cronologic”, București: Editura Muzicală
