= Cotescu =

Cotescy is a Romanian surname. Notable people with the surname include:

- Christinel Cotescu (1912–1998), Romanian aristocrat, wife of philosopher Mircea Eliade
- Octavian Cotescu (born Octavian Coteț; 1931–1985), Romanian actor and politician
- Maria Cotescu (1896–1980), Romanian architect
