= Emil Simon =

Romanian conductor and composer (1936–2014)

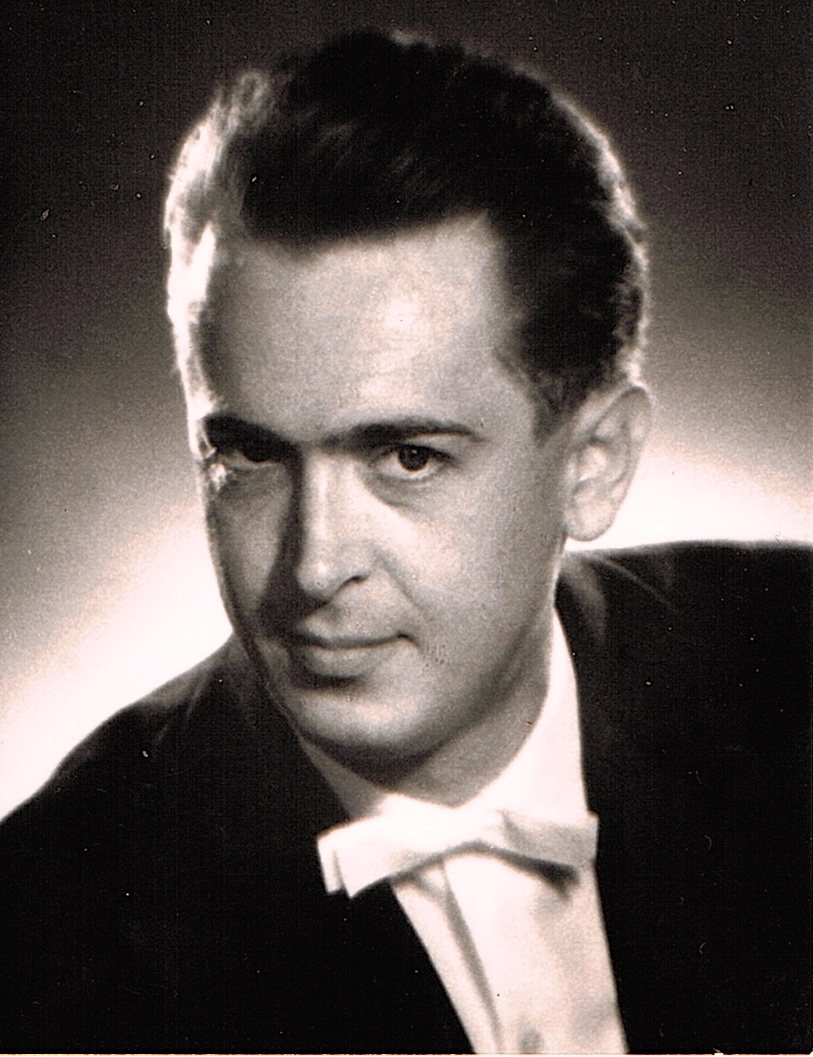
- Simon as a young conductor
- Born: 24 September 1936; Chișinău, Romania (now Moldova)
- Died: 25 February 2014 (aged 77); Cluj-Napoca, Romania
- Occupations: Conductor, composer
- Years active: 1961–2014

Emil Simon (24 September 1936 – 25 February 2014) was a Romanian conductor and composer.

== Life and career ==
Born in 1936 in Chișinău, Romania, Emil Simon began studying the piano at the early age of 6. After acquiring more musical knowledge at the Music High School, he continued his studies at the "Gheorghe Dima" Conservatory in Cluj, Romania where he studied under the composer and musicologist Sigismund Toduță and conductor Antonin Ciolan. During these years, he was awarded the "George Enescu" State Scholarship.

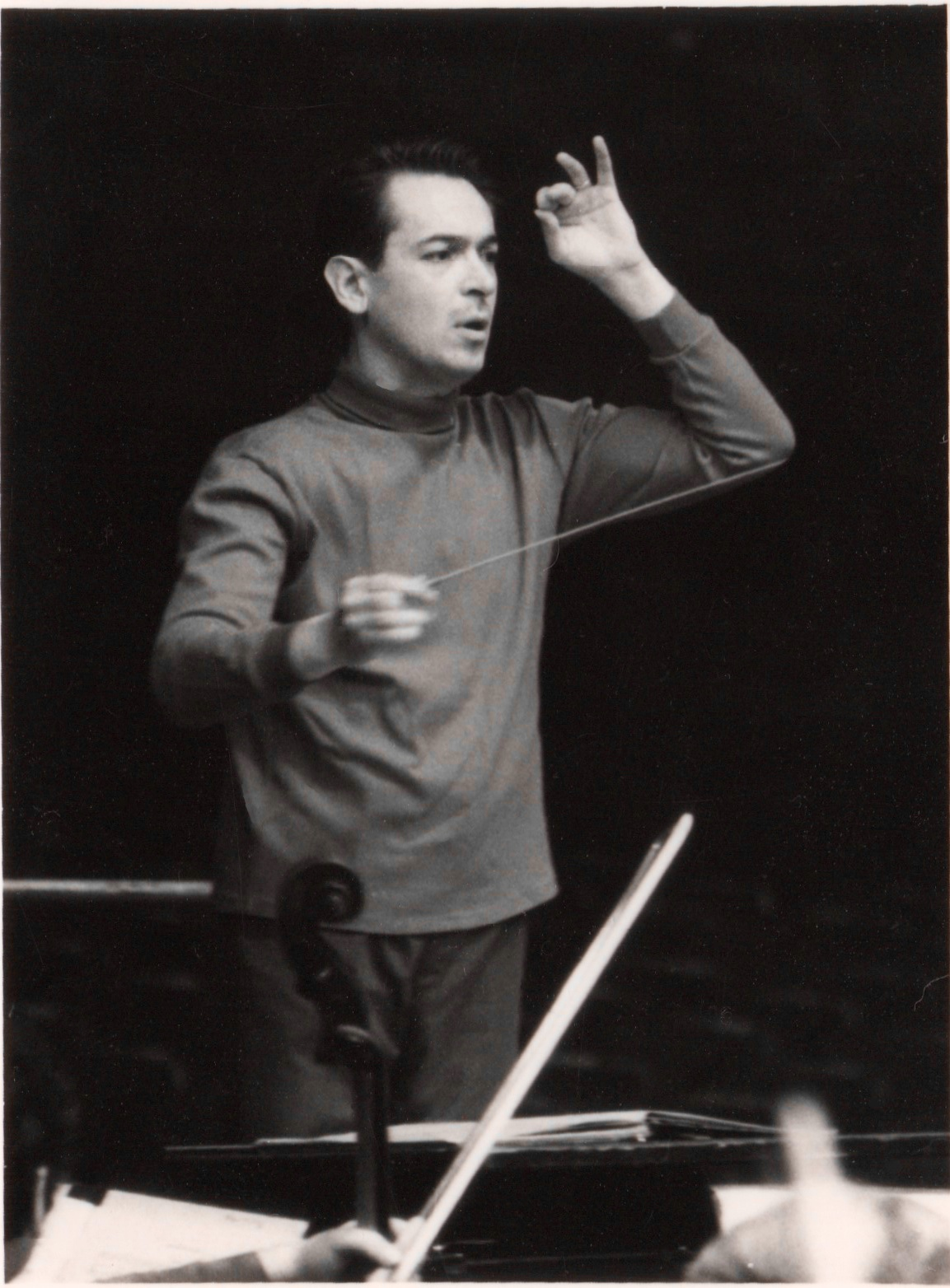
Emil Simon during rehearsals

After graduating in 1960 from the conservatory in Cluj with a double major in symphonic orchestra conducting and composition, Simon was immediately appointed permanent conductor of the State Philharmonic Orchestra of Cluj, a position he held for most of his career of over 50 years.

In February 1964 he completed postgraduate courses in Paris at the Conservatoire National Supérieur de Musique, where he studied with Nadia Boulanger, Manuel Rosenthal and Olivier Messiaen. He also continued his studies in conducting with Sergiu Celibidache, in Stockholm, Paris, Munich, and Prague.

His international debut came in September of the same year, winning the first prize among the 40 competitors of the 14th International Competition for Young Conductors, in Besançon, France.

During his long career, he conducted more than 1500 concerts. He was a guest conductor of all the symphony orchestras in Romania, including the National Radio Orchestra of Romania and the "George Enescu" Philharmonic Orchestra Bucharest, as well of many orchestras in Europe, North America and Asia such as the Munich Philharmonic, Berlin Radio Symphony Orchestra, Calgary Philharmonic Orchestra, Sofia Symphonic Orchestra, MDR Leipzig Radio Symphony Orchestra, Belgrade Philharmonic Orchestra. Between 1998 and 2000, Emil Simon was also the artistic director of the Transylvania State Philharmonic Orchestra of Cluj.

Emil Simon had a wide-ranging repertoire of symphonic works of all periods and styles, and he was a promoter of symphonic music written by Romanian composers, like George Enescu, Sigismund Toduta, Cornel Țăranu, Liviu Glodeanu, Mihai Moldovan, and Tiberiu Olah, among others. Many of these pieces were recorded in Romania for broadcast on radio and television, as well as on LPs and CDs, primarily for the Electrecord label.

As a composer, Simon composed a symphony, a sonata for orchestra, and two cantatas as well as numerous instrumental chamber music pieces and vocal works.

In his role as a teacher, he participated in the formation of new generations of Romanian musicians by teaching the orchestra and chamber music classes at the "Gheorghe Dima" Conservatory.

Simon was also invited to be a judge in international competitions in Italy, Germany, Hungary, and he taught master classes at various universities.

== Distinctions and honorary titles ==
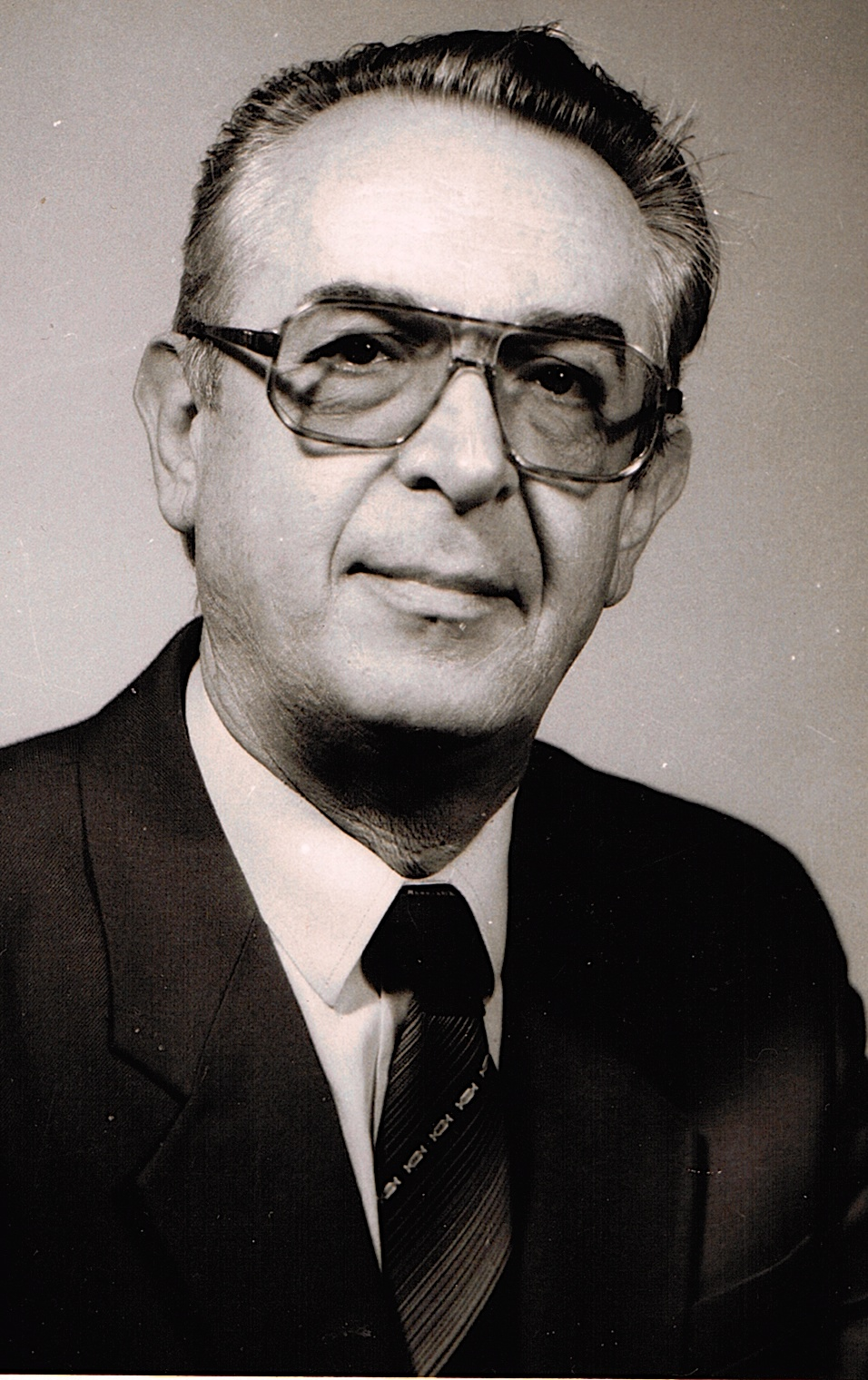
Emil Simon

- Romanian Ordinul Național "Serviciul Credincios" in grad de Cavaler – 2003
- Doctor Honoris Causa of the Gheorghe Dima Music Academy in Cluj – 2011
- Professor Honoris Causa of the Babeș-Bolyai University in Cluj
- Diploma from the Composers Union of Romania (Uniunea Compozitorilor și Muzicologilor din România) for the interpretation of Romanian Music
- Diploma of excellence from the Musicians of Romania for lifetime achievements
- Diploma of Excellence from the Oradea Philharmonic Orchestra
- Diploma of Excellence from the Brașov Philharmonic Orchestra
- Honorary Citizen of Cluj-Napoca, Romania – 2000 (Cetatean de onoare)

== Recordings ==
Simon's recordings include:

- Brahms – Symphony No.2 (STM-ECE 0706)
- Brahms – Symphony No.3 (STM-ECE 01195)
- Wagner – Ouvertures: Meistersinger, Tannhäuser, Tristan und Isolde (STM-ECE 0954)
- Rimsky-Korsakov – Scheherazade (STM-ECE 01241)
- Bizet – Arlesienne, Suite No.2 (ST-ECE 01605)
- Bottesini – Passione amorosa [Ovidiu Badila, doublebass & Catalin Ilea, cello - live 1991] (Olympia OCD422)
- Offenbach – Concerto militaire [Catalin Ilea, cello - live 1991] (Olympia OCD422)
- Tchaikovsky – Fantasy Ouverture Romeo and Juliet
- Mozart – Piano Concerto No.10, KV 365; Piano Concerto No. 22, KV 482 (STM-ECE 01272)
- Mozart – Piano Concerto No.27, KV 595 (ECE 01967)
- Beethoven – Piano Concerto No.4, Op. 44; Fantasy for piano chorus and orchestra Op. 80 (STM-ECE 02829)
- Beethoven – Piano Concerto No.5 in E-flat major, Op. 73 (ST-ECE 03344)
- Ravel – Daphnis et Chloé, Suite No.2
- Debussy – La Mer
- Lipatti – Satrarii Suite (STM-ECE 01120)
- Enescu – Rhapsody No.1 in A
- Enescu – Symphony No.3 Op.21 (ST-ECE 01234)
- Toduţă – Symphony No.5; Concerto No.2 for string orchestra (ST-ECE 01380)
- Toduţă – Miorita – Balada oratoriu (ECE 0950)
- Toduţă – Pe urmele lui Horia (ST-ECE 01598)
- Toduţă – Concerto for wind instruments and percussion (ST-ECE 02587)
- Porumbescu – Balada (ST-ECE 02179)
- Țăranu – Garlands for Orchestra (ST-ECE 01806)
- Koppel – Variations for piano, 2 clarinets and percussion (ST-ECE 02717)
- Glodeanu – Ulysse, Op.20 (ST-ECE 01865)
- Rotaru – Concerto for saxophone and orchestra
- Ioachimescu – Concerto for saxophone and orchestra
- Souvenir from Romania (ST-ECE 01302)
- Romantic Walk Through Romanian Music
