= Gheorghe Ciobanu =

Romanian ethnomusicologist and Byzantine specialist

Gheorghe Ciobanu (February 4, 1909 – June 29, 1995) was a Romanian ethnomusicologist and Byzantine specialist. He published several important papers on early Romanian psalm music and Romanian folklore. The musicologist Viorel Cosma, wrote that Ciobanu's "studies of Romanian folklore did much to solve questions about popular modes and methods of versification, and contributed greatly to the history of folk collections and popular music." He was awarded the Romanian Composers' Union prize five times (1969, 1974, 1977, 1979, 1987), and was twice awarded the prize of the Romanian Academy (1957, 1978).

== Life and career ==
Born in Pădureni village, Ilfov County, Ciobanu was educated at the National University of Music Bucharest where he was a student from 1931 through 1938, and later 1943 through 1945. He later earned a doctorate from the Gheorghe Dima Music Academy in Cluj in 1972 with his dissertation written on Clejani musicians. From 1939 through 1952 he worked as a music teacher, and from 1949 through 1968 he worked as an assistant in research at the Bucharest Institute of Folklore. He finished his career as a senior lecturer in folklore at the Iaşi Conservatory.

Ciobanu died in Bucharest on June 29, 1995 at the age of 86.
