= Irina Hasnaș =

Romanian composer

Irina Olga Hasnaș (born 15 July 1954) is a Romanian composer.

== Life and career ==
She was born in Bucharest, Romania, and studied at the Ciprian Porumbescu Academy of Music with Ștefan Niculescu, Aurel Stroe, Alexandru Pașcanu, and Nicolae Beloiu. She continued her studies with composer Theodor Grigoriu, and in 2000 received a doctorate in music from the Gheorghe Dima National Music Academy in Cluj-Napoca.

After completing her studies, Hasnaș worked as a composer and an editor for Romanian National Radio. Her works have been performed internationally.

== Works ==
Selected works include:

- Concerto for Orchestra (1978)
- Evocation, lyric poem for chamber orchestra (1980)
- Symphony I, for orchestra (1990)
- Metamorphose, for chamber and vocal ensemble (1978)
- Melismas, for piano (1979)
- Voices of Mioritza, for wind quintet (1980)
- Polychomie, for chamber ensemble and tape (1982)
- Evolutio I, for clarinet and string quartet (1983)
- Evolutio II, for trio – oboe, cello, and piano (1985)
- Evolutio III, for string quartet (1988)
- Monodie, for solo bassoon (1989)
- Games, for solo cello (1993)
- Inner Voices, for wind quintet (1994)
- Endless Column, for solo flute (1996)
- The Musical Box, for trio – clarinet, piano, and violin (2000)
- The Rooster, The light announcer, for bassclarinet, clarinet, alto, violin, piano, and percussion (2005)
- Dance, for bassoon and violin (2009)
- A Possible Valse, for solo bassoon (2010)
- Romania, poem for chorus on the lignes of Ioan Alexandru (1981)
- The Earth, cycle of four songs for mezzo-soprano, clarinet, cello, percussion, and tape on the lignes of Ion Barbu (1983)
- The Time, cycle of four songs for soprano or tenor, violin, alto and cello on the lignes of Nichita Stănescu (1983)
- Metamorphose, cycle of five songs for soprano and piano on the lignes of Nichita Stănescu (1990)
