= Silvia Șerbescu =

Romanian concert pianist (1903-1965)

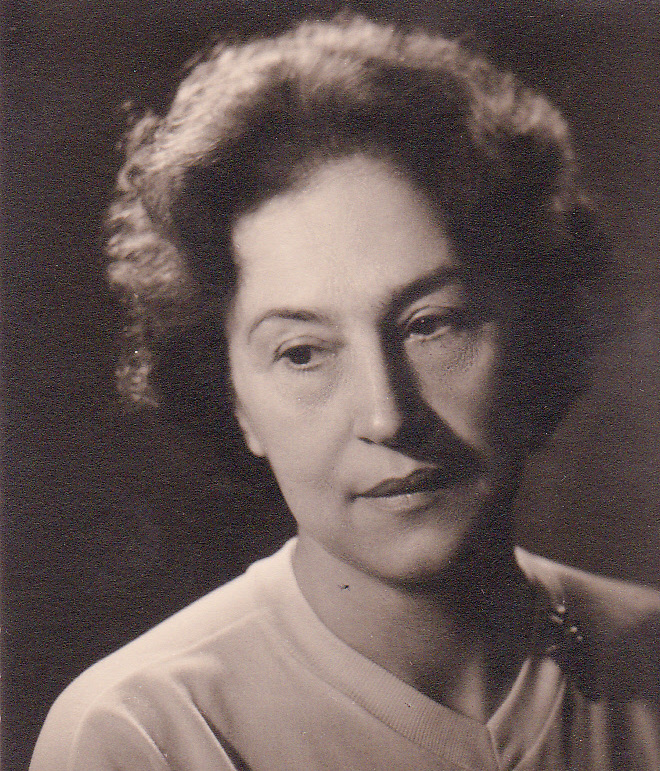
- Occupations: Pianist, music pedagog

Silvia Șerbescu (January 27, 1903 – April 22, 1965) was a Romanian concert pianist. She was one of the first important concert pianists emerging from the Romanian piano school, and a distinguished piano pedagogue. Her interpretations of Rachmaninoff, Prokofiev and Debussy were memorable. From 1948 until 1965 she was a piano professor at the Bucharest Music Conservatory.

== Biography ==
Silvia Șerbescu was born to a family dedicated to intellectual pursuits. Her father, Gheorghe Chelaru, was a professor of Latin, Greek and Romanian at the elite Gheorghe Lazar secondary school in Bucharest, who composed didactic manuals of Romanian language and literature for all degrees. He also was the preceptor of King Ferdinand and Queen Maria's children Nicholas and Maria. Her mother, Eliza Bunescu, was the daughter of Ioan Bunescu and granddaughter of Gheorghe Ionescu, both notable composers of choral music.

She started her musical studies at the Bucharest Royal Academy of Music – piano with Constanța Erbiceanu (a disciple of Carl Reinecke, Max Reger and Moritz Moszkowski, and one of the founders of the Romanian piano school), harmony and counterpoint with Dumitru Georgescu Kiriac and Alfonso Castaldi, graduating at the same time the Mathematics Faculty of the University of Bucharest. Further in Paris, at the École Normale de Musique, she studied with Lazare Lévy and Alfred Cortot and graduated with highest honors and a “licence de concert”.

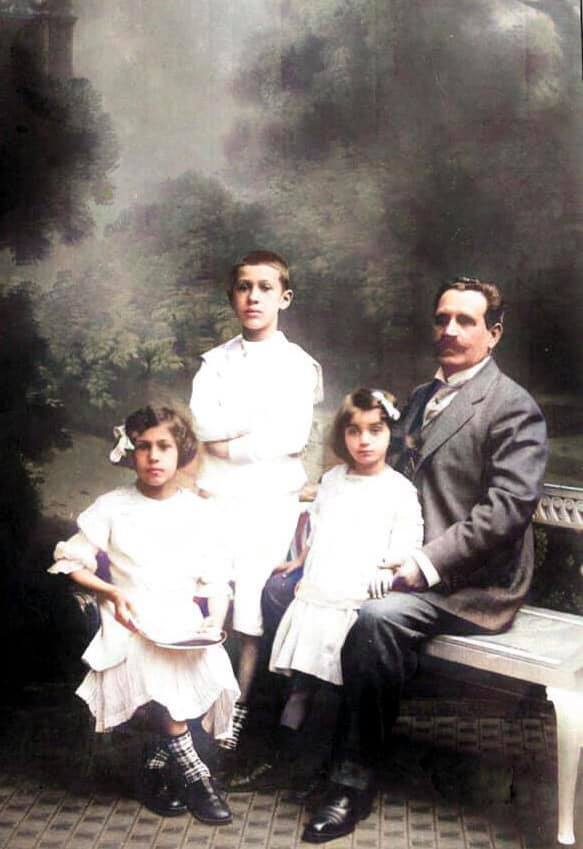
Silvia with brother, cousin and their grandfather, composer and conductor Ioan Bunescu

Her debut in Bucharest in 1928, with Liszt's Piano Concerto nr. 1, and a recital one year later, was perceived as sensational. George Breazul wrote: “…Silvia Serbescu steps into the Romanian musical life, best honouring our musical aspirations”. Constanța Erbiceanu considered Silvia Serbescu's art as “a synthesis of masculine thinking and feminine sensitivity”. Silvia's large and expressive hands similar to Clara Schumann’s, could be the anatomic clue to the “monumental character of her interpretations, the sense of space, of wide, open horizons” mentioned by the musicologist Iosif Sava when he tried to characterize Silvia's pianistic style. In addition, a genuine, existential interpretative involvement in Silvia Șerbescu's playing may explain the powerful impact she had on her audience.

Silvia Șerbescu performed in France, Italy, Poland, Yugoslavia, Turkey, Sweden, Finland, Czechoslovakia and the Soviet Union, with renowned conductors as George Georgescu, Ionel Perlea, Constantin Silvestri, Sergiu Comissiona, Ernest Ansermet, Nikolai Anosov, Aleksandr Gauk, Vaclav Neumann, Paavo Berglund and many others. Between 1955 and 1957 she was appointed soloist of the Bucharest “George Enescu” Philharmonic, with which she performed in Czechoslovakia and the Soviet Union.

One of the highlights of her career was the 1962 series of recitals commemorating the centennial of Claude Debussy’s birth, playing the two books of the 24 Preludes. She also collaborated in chamber music recitals with George Enescu, whose autograph on the programme of their December 29, 1942 recital reads: “To my remarkable partner of this evening, with admiration and respect”.

She was married to the engineer Florian Șerbescu and had a daughter, Liana Margareta, who also became a leading pianist.

From 1948 until her untimely death in 1965 she was piano professor at the Bucharest State Conservatory “Ciprian Porumbescu”. Many of her students made significant careers, as Mihai Brediceanu, Constantin Ionescu-Vovu, Theodor Paraschivescu, Alexander Šumski, Lavinia Coman, Sanda Bobescu, Georgeta Ștefănescu-Barnea, Liana Șerbescu, Sever Tipei, Peter Szaunig and others.

Iosif Sava called Șerbescu “one of the most beloved teachers” of the Bucharest Music Conservatory. A bust of Silvia Șerbescu by Gheorghe D. Anghel is featured in the main hall of the Bucharest University of Music.

== Repertoire ==
Silvia Șerbescu's repertoire included works by Bach, Beethoven, Brahms, Liszt, Debussy, Ravel, Busoni, Respighi, Enescu, De Falla, Albeniz and, notably, Rachmaninoff and Prokofiev. She performed the Romanian premieres of Rachmaninoff's Rhapsody on a theme by Paganini, Busoni's Indian Fantasy, De Falla's Nights in the Gardens of Spain, Respighi's Toccata for piano and orchestra, Prokofiev's Piano Concertos Nr. 2 and Nr. 3, and Ravel's Piano concerto for the left hand. She was among the first pianists to perform George Enescu's demanding Sonata op. 24 nr.1 in F sharp minor.

== Recordings ==
Only a few of her recordings survive. They include:

- Prokofiev: Concerto for piano and orchestra Nr.3 in C major, Symphony Orchestra of the USSR, Nikolai Anosov conductor. Electrecord, Bucharest, 1956. (ECD 22)
- Silvia Șerbescu, Recital: Spanish music. Electrecord, Bucharest, 1967. (ECC 866)
- Silvia Șerbescu, Recital: Albeniz, Debussy, Rahmaninov, Prokofiev. CD. Casa Radio, Bucharest, 2004.
- Debussy 150. CD. Casa Radio, Bucharest, 2012
- Silvia and Liana Șerbescu (Bach and Respighi). CD. Electrecord, Bucharest, 2014 (EDC 1108-1109)

== Awards ==
- 1924 Dini Poenaru-Căplescu and Paul Ciuntu Prizes (awarded by a committee that included George Enescu, Cella Delavrancea, Mihail Jora, Alfred Alessandrescu)
- 1943 Romanian Order “Meritul Cultural”, awarded by King Michael I of Romania
- 1955 Romanian State Prize
- 1955 Romanian Award “Artistă Emerită”

== Bibliography ==
- Lavinia Coman: Rememorare – Silvia Șerbescu – 50 de ani de posteritate, Revista MUZICA, Nr. 3–4, 2015.
- Viorel Cosma: Muzicieni români - Lexicon, Editura Muzicală a Uniunii Compozitorilor, București, 1970.
- Viorel Cosma: Muzicieni din România - Lexicon, Vol. I, Editura Muzicală, București, 1989.
- Viorel Cosma: Muzicieni din România - Lexicon, Vol. IV, Editura Muzicală, București, 2001.
- Iosif Sava and Florian Șerbescu: Silvia Șerbescu: ghid biografic, Editura Muzicală, București, 1976.
- Lavinia Coman: Silvia Șerbescu, Prima noastră pianistă, Editura Muzicală Grafoart, București, 2019.
