= Henrieta Delavrancea =

Romanian architect

- Born: 19 October 1897; Bucharest, Kingdom of Romania
- Died: 26 March 1987 (aged 89); Bucharest, Romania
- Resting place: Bellu Cemetery, Bucharest
- Other names: Henrieta Delavrancea-Gibory
- Occupation: architect
- Known for: First female admitted to the Superior School of Architecture in Bucharest
- Spouse: Emile Gibory (married in 1918)

Henrieta Delavrancea (1897–1987) was a Romanian architect and one of the first female architects admitted to the Superior School of Architecture in Bucharest, but because of the suspension of her classes during World War I, she was not the first female to graduate. She was one of the best known women architects in Romania and a significant contributor to the modernist school of Romanian architecture, until state-controlled design in the communist era curtailed individuality.

== Biography ==
Henrieta Delavrancea was born on 19 October 1897 in Bucharest, Kingdom of Romania to Maria Lupaşcu and Barbu Ștefănescu Delavrancea Because her family was from the upper levels of society and her father was both a politician and a literary figure, Delavrancea grew up surrounded by noted members of Romanian society. One of those early mentors was Ion Mincu, one of the best known Romanian architects and proponents of preservation of national identity in architecture. In 1913, she enrolled in the High School of Architecture, in a class of twenty, with only one other woman, Marioara Ioanovici. Though she was one of the first women admitted, she suspended her studies in 1916 because of the war.

During World War I, she served as a nurse and married Emile Gibory in 1918. They lived briefly in Paris and then moved to the mountains, living in Nehoiu. After two years, they moved to the area of Penteleu, Romania, but in 1924, Delavrancea decided to return to her studies. In the 1926–1927 term, she graduated with a diploma and later on claimed to be the fourth female architect in the country after "Ada Zăgănescu, Virginia Andreescu and Mimi Friedman". This may or may not be accurate, as the Romanian Architects' Society had six female registrants in 1924: Maria Cotescu, Irineu Maria Friedman, Virginia Andreescu Haret, Maria Hogas, Antonetta Ioanovici and Ada Zăgănescu. On the other hand, Delavrancea designed her first home, called the "German House", in 1921, before she finished school, while living in Nehoiu. She also might have confused the names, as Zăgănescu studied privately with Ion Mincu and is acknowledged as the first practicing female architect, Andreescu-Haret is recognized as the first graduate of the High School in 1919 and the first registered female architect, and Cotescu graduated from the High School of Architecture in Bucharest in 1922.

Her next project was her own home on Mihai Eminescu Street in Bucharest, which she designed in 1925. Delavrancea designed many private and public buildings, among them 22 seaside houses in Balcic (now Balchik, Bulgaria), including homes for General Gheorghe Rasoviceanu where Gheorghe Petrașcu painted between 1934 and 1935, Mircea Cancicov, Ion Pillat and Eliza Brătianu. She also designed a renovation to the City Hall, the Pavilion of the Border Guards, and the Tea Pavilion at the Balchik Palace, designed for Queen Marie of Romania. She built 28 villas throughout the country; worked on 5 churches, including the renovation of the New St. George Church in Bucharest; the Snagov Palace for Prince Nicholas; worked on at least three health facilities—the Institutul Clinic Fundeni on the outskirts of Bucharest, the Filantropia Hospital and the Headquarters of the Hygiene and Public Health Institute; the Capitol Cinema and the French Consulate in Bucharest; the Prefecture Office in Oraviţa and many others.

Delavrancea was one of the best known women architects in Romania and a significant contributor to the modernist movement. Her many villas in the seaside town of Balcic built between 1934 and 1938 are especially notable, taking traditional forms and local motifs and reinterpreting them in functional, modern design. Here she used rubble stone retaining walls and bases, low pitched tiled roof with wide projecting cornices, combined with plain white rectangular walls. Because of the unique foundation requirements of building on the coast, she employed corbelling and consoling techniques for support. The Constantiniu House, built in 1935, is the most dramatically site and well known.

In Bucharest one of her notable designs was a new modernist facade to the Capitol Theatre on Queen Elisabeta Boulevard, built in 1938. The design originally included a striking off-centre vertical fin, highlighted by neon. Her villa for Professor Victor Vâlcovici, at 44 London Street, built in 1937–38, with its clean lines and prominent curved corner window, is one of the most often reproduced images of modernist houses in Bucharest.

After World War II, she worked on conservation and restoration projects. During the communist era, she worked for 19 years on the design team of the Ministry of Health, as private practice was banned and design was controlled by the state until 1989.

Delavrancea-Gibory, died aged 89 on 26 March 1987 in Bucharest. Several exhibitions featuring her work have been held since her death. In 2011, a book entitled Henrieta Delavrancea Gibory - arhitectură 1930-1940 edited by Militza Sion featured drawings and buildings by Delavrancea-Gibory.

== Gallery ==
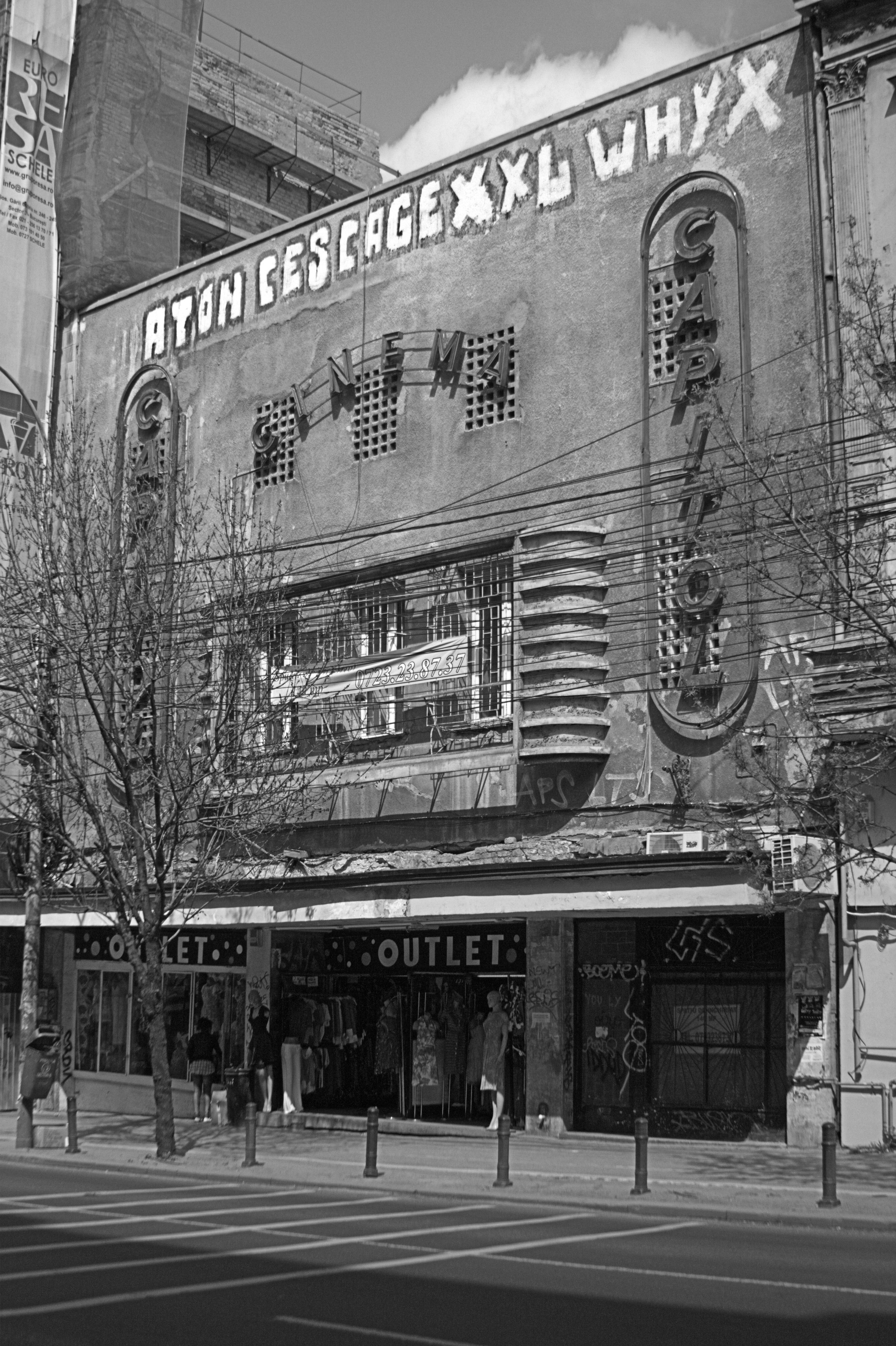
Former Capitol Cinema, Bucharest (2010)

== Sources ==
- Machedon, Luminita; Scoffham, Ernie (1999). Romanian Modernism: The Architecture of Bucharest 1920-1940. Cambridge, Massachusetts: MIT Press. ISBN 978-0-262-13348-7.
- Petrescu, Ioana-Maria (2012). "Pioneering Women Architects". In Teodorescu, Nicoleta Doina (ed.). Architecture Series, Vol II (PDF). Vol. 4. Bucharest, Romania: România de Mâine Foundation Publishing House.
