= Mihai Gavrilă =

Romanian quantum physicist

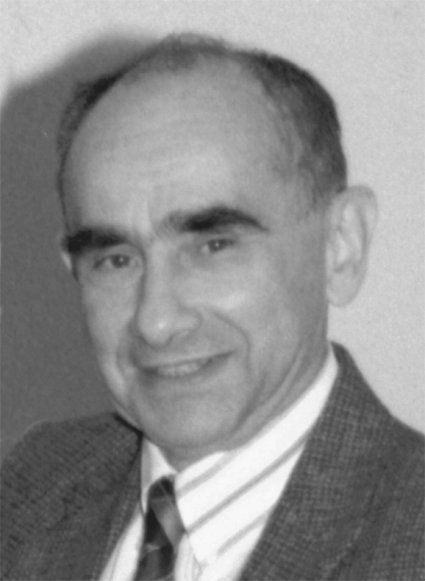
- Professor Mihai Gavrilă
- Born: October 10, 1929 (age 96); Cluj, Kingdom of Romania
- Education: Faculty of Physics, University of Bucharest
- Known for: Quantum theory, the Relativistic K-Shell Photoeffect
- Scientific career
- Fields: Theoretical physics
- Workplaces: University of Bucharest; FOM Institute for Atomic and Molecular Physics
- Doctoral advisor: Șerban Țițeica

Mihai Gavrilă (Romanian pronunciation: [miˈhaj ɡaˈvrilə]; b. October 16, 1929, Cluj) is a Romanian quantum physicist and a corresponding member of the Romanian Academy since 1974. He made fundamental contributions to the quantum theories of electromagnetic interactions with atoms.

== Education ==
His parents were Ion and Florica Gavrilă (née Vișoiu). His father taught medicine and his mother taught English at the University of Cluj. He began his higher education at the Gheorghe Lazăr High School in Sibiu, and completed his studies at the Seminarul Pedagogic Universitar of the University of Cluj. Then, in 1948, he enrolled in the School of Mathematics and Physics at the University of Bucharest, from which he graduated in 1953 with a major in physics, and a minor in radiotechnology. While still a student, between 1951 and 1953, he became a teaching assistant to Professor Eugen Bădărău in the Optics Laboratory of the School of Physics.

=== Doctoral studies ===
In 1953, Gavrilă was accepted for doctoral studies in theoretical physics by Professor Șerban Țițeica in the School of Physics at the University of Bucharest. He completed successfully his doctoral studies with a Ph.D. thesis entitled The Relativistic Theory of the Photoelectric Effect, building on work of Albert Einstein and Alexandru Proca. He published in 1959 the main results of his Ph.D. thesis in a peer-reviewed paper in Physical Review.

== Academic career ==
In 1956, Gavrilă was appointed Assistant Professor in the Department of Thermodynamics, Statistical Physics and Quantum Mechanics of the School of Physics of the University of Bucharest, where he was subsequently promoted to Associate Professorsh in 1962, and to full Professor in 1968. He also studied as a visiting scholar at several major physics centers around the world: the Joint Institute for Nuclear Research in Dubna, Soviet Union, the Joint Institute for Laboratory Astrophysics in Boulder, Colorado, the International Centre for Theoretical Physics in Trieste, Italy, and the University of Pittsburgh, in Pittsburgh, Pennsylvania. He taught courses on Quantum mechanics, Group representations, and Lorentz group transformations.

He was elected a corresponding Member of the Romanian Academy in 1974. However, in spite of his election to the Academy, he refused to become entangled in any political affairs under the increasingly dictatorial communist regime, and finally he had to leave his country for Norway in the autumn of 1974. At first, Gavrilă worked at the Norwegian University of Science and Technology in Trondheim) and at the Royal Institute of Technology (KTH), in Stockholm, Sweden. In 1975 he settled in Amsterdam at the FOM Institute for Atomic and Molecular Physics (AMOLF), where he became the theoretical physics group leader. Since 1992 he has worked as a Senior Scientist at the Institute for Theoretical Atomic, Molecular and Optical Physics (ITAMP) based at the Harvard–Smithsonian Center for Astrophysics, in Cambridge, Massachusetts.

After 1990 he was able to visit Romania several times and continued to contribute also to the development of theoretical physics research in Romania.

== Scientific achievements ==
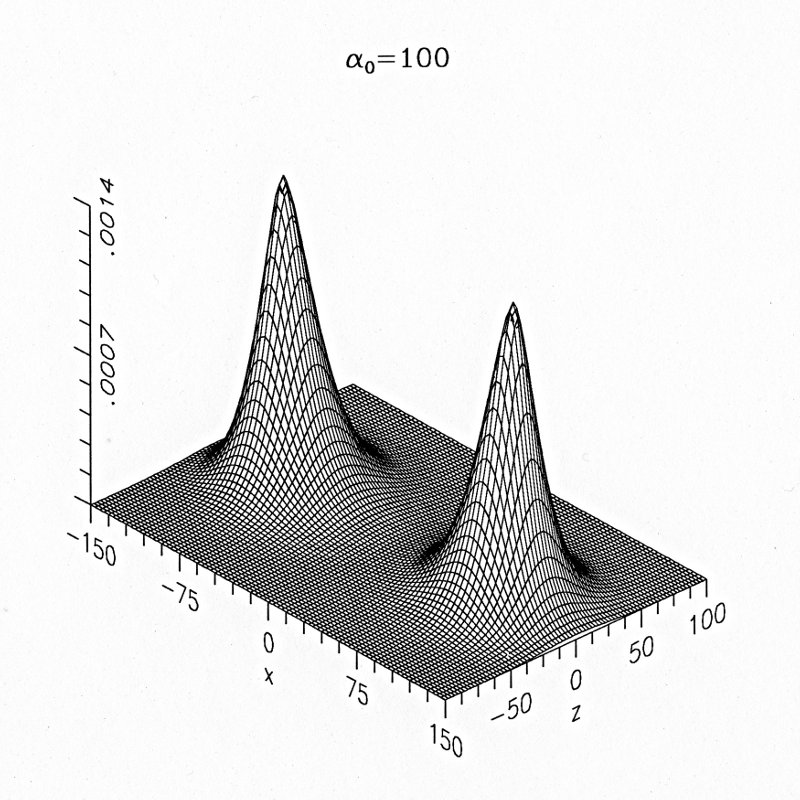
Atomic Dichotomy. The wave function of atomic hydrogen in a high frequency, ultra-high intensity laser field, represented in a plane passing through the symmetry axis of the laser field. $\alpha_0 = I^{1/2}\omega^{-2}$, where $I$ is the laser field intensity, and $\omega$ is its frequency in atomic units.

=== Radiative transitions between the inner atomic shells ===
Gavrilă completed in 1977 his previous work on the relativistic theory of the photoelectric effect in the inner atomic orbitals that he had begun in his Ph.D. thesis in 1958; thus, he applied radiative corrections to his previous calculations He also investigated two-photon excitations and the elastic photon scattering amplitude in the hydrogen ground state. He completed also the non-relativistic Compton scattering calculation for an electron in the K-shell These calculations were then extended in the dipolar approximation to the study of Compton scattering in the L- shell. The results of his investigations confirmed the presence of the infrared divergence—as predicted in quantum electrodynamics, and also predicted the presence of a resonance in the spectrum of the scattered photons.

=== Interactions of laser beams with atoms ===
He began this research in 1976 in connection with experimental studies carried out at AMOLF by the group of Marnix van der Wiel. Initially, his interest was focused on multi-photon transitions treated by non-perturbation quantum theory. However, he switched to perturbation methods in quantum theory when it became possible experimentally to attain ultra-high laser intensities at very high frequencies based on the High-Intensity High-Frequency Floquet Theory (HI-HFFT). His investigations lead to very surprising results—the phenomenon of ``atomic dichotomy" in which the hydrogen atom when it is placed in a linearly polarized field exhibits a splitting of its spherical charge distribution into two lobes that oscillate in the laser field. On the other hand, in a circularly polarized laser field, the hydrogen atom's charge distribution takes on a toroidal shape with its symmetry axis oriented along the propagation vector of the field and passing through the center of the atom. His theory also predicts for two-electron atoms the appearance of a new bound state which is induced by the ultra-intense laser field; these are 'light-induced excited states'. Apparently paradoxical events do occur in the presence of the extremely intense laser field: a proton can bind more than two electrons thus leading to the formation of hydrogen negative ions with multiple negative charges that are relatively stable. Other novel and unexpected properties of molecules were also predicted in the presence of such ultra-intense laser fields.

== Scientific leadership ==
Gavrilă organized several international physics conferences, such as International Conference on Atomic Physics, International Conference on Photonic, Electronic, and Atomic Collisions, and International Conference on Multiphoton Processes. He was also a peer-reviewer for Physical Review A (1991–1993), Journal of Physics B and several other international physics journals.

He also managed several projects financed by the European Union and Stichting FOM. He coordinated successfully the project Atoms in Super-intense, Femtosecond Pulses involving four experimental laboratories and theoretical groups from France, Belgium and the Netherlands, to build an ultra high-power laser at the Laboratoire d'Optique Appliquée in Palaiseau, France.

== Family ==
In the early 1950s, Gavrilă was married for three years to Ana-Dorica Blaga, the daughter of Lucian Blaga. Mihai Gavrilă has two children, Ioa-Silva Gavrilă and Dariu-Mihai Gavrilă from his marriage with the pianist Liana Șerbescu. Both are computer scientists.
