= Maria Cotescu =

Romanian architect

- Born: 1896
- Died: 1980 (aged 83–84)
- Other names: Marica Cottescu
- Occupations: architect, architectural theorist
- Known for: Design of the
- Notable work: CFR railway industrial complex

Maria Cotescu (sometimes shown as Maria Cottescu or Marica Cottescu) (1896–1980) was one of the first female Romanian architects. She was most prolific in the period between the wars and was one of the few architects of the period whose theoretical design writings were parallel to her design implementation. She is most known for large industrial works, like the Romanian Railway Company's industrial and office project.

== Biography ==
Maria Cotescu was born in 1896 in Romania to Maria (née Tufelcică) and Dumitru Cotescu, a general in the Romanian Army during World War I. She graduated from the High School of Architecture in Bucharest in 1922 and in 1924, she was one of only six women, who had been allowed membership in the Romanian Architects Society, the others being Irineu Maria Friedman, Virginia Andreescu Haret, Maria Hogas, Antonetta Ioanovici and Ada Zăgănescu. Some sources indicate that she also later attended the Superior School of Architecture in Bucharest, graduating after Henrieta Delavrancea did so in 1926–1927.

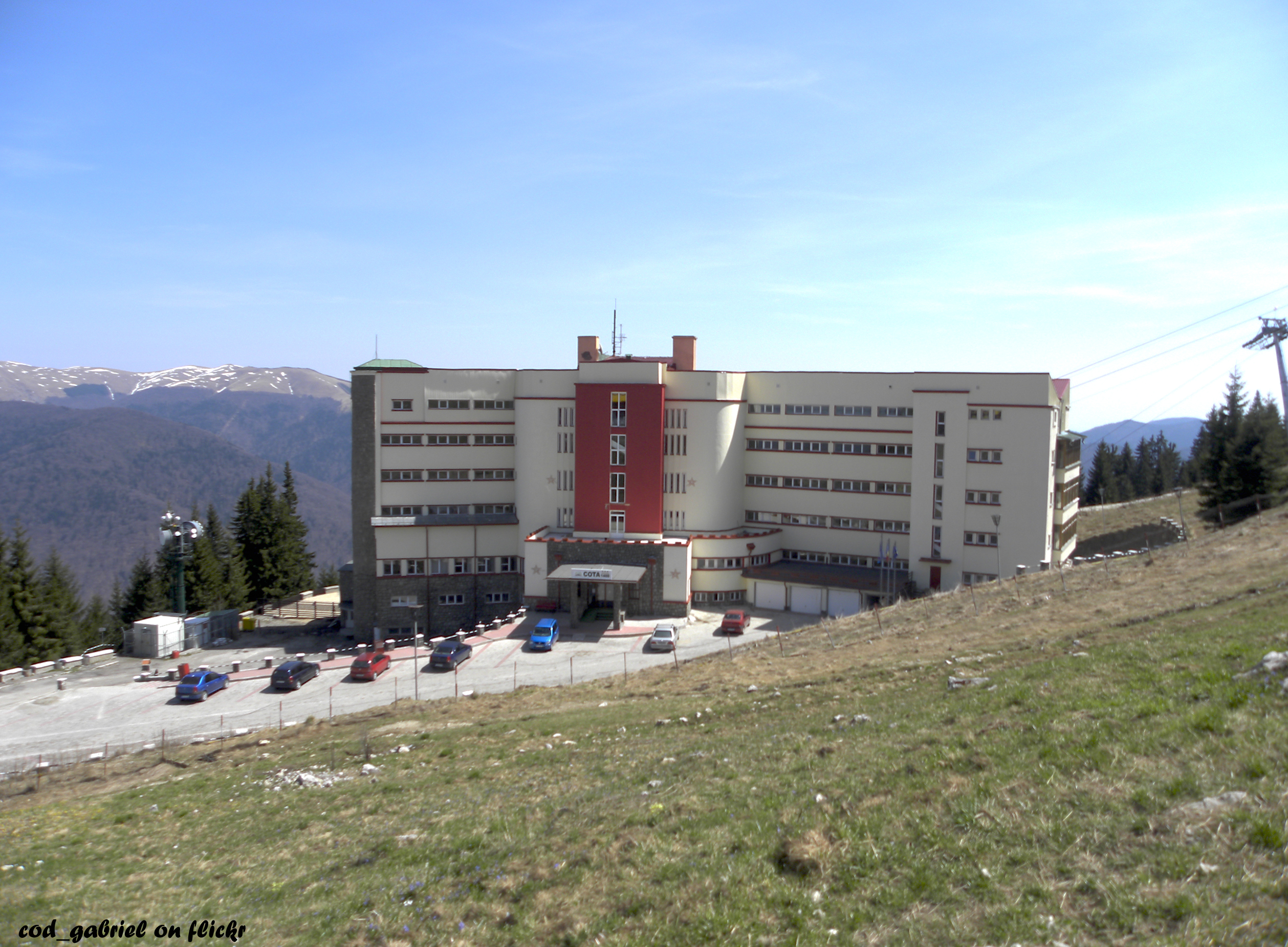
Hotel Cota 1400, Sinaia

She was most prolific building in the era between the wars, and typically built industrial buildings like the 1400 Altitude Hotel in Sinaia, which she worked on between 1931 and 1933 in collaboration with Ilie Teodorescu or the industrial buildings she designed for the Romanian Railway Company in 1933. The CFR project was completed over several years and included work on the Griviţa workshops, CFR offices, power plant and administration building. The Griviţa building was one of the first to use red brick, to be designed in a modern style and to use functional technology, making it a model for later works by other architects. Alexandru Tănăsescu collaborated on the buildings which were constructed between 1933 and 1940.

In addition to design and construction work, Cotescu published articles on architectural theory, which appeared in such journals as Technology Magazine (Romanian: Revista Tehnica), the Polytechnic Society Bulletin (Romanian: Buletinul Societatii Politehnice), Architecture (Romanian: Arhitectura) and Symmetry Magazine (Romanian: Revista Simetria).

Cotescu died in Romania in 1980.

== Works ==
- 1931–1933 in collaboration with Ilie Teodorescu, 1400 Altitude Hotel in Sinaia.
- 1933–1940 in collaboration with Alexandru Tănăsescu, CFR railroad industrial complex, Bucharest
- 1950 student dormitory in Câmpulung Moldovenesc

== Selected publishing ==
- Cotescu, Maria (1940). "Arhitectura ca tema a gandirii". Simetria (in Romanian) (2): 17–18.
- Cotescu, Maria (1940). "Detaliul". Simetria (in Romanian) (2): 63–64.
- Antonescu, Petre; Cotescu, Maria; Antonescu, Dinu (1963). Clădiri: Construcţii, proiecte şi studii (in Romanian). Bucharest: Editura Tehnică. OCLC 895321703.

== Sources ==
- Machedon, Luminita; Scoffham, Ernie (1999). Romanian Modernism: The Architecture of Bucharest 1920-1940. Cambridge, Massachusetts: MIT Press. ISBN 978-0-262-13348-7.
