= Dina Cocea =

Romanian actress

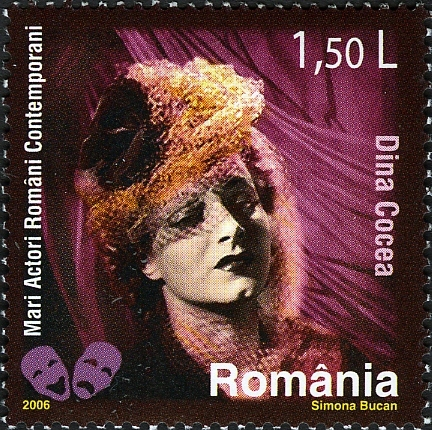
- Dina Cocea on a Romanian stamp from 2006
- Born: Maria Constantina Cocea; 27 November 1912; Bucharest, Kingdom of Romania
- Died: 28 October 2008 (aged 95); Bucharest, Romania
- Resting place: Bellu Cemetery, Bucharest
- Occupation(s): Actress, academic
- Known for: Elisabeta Movilă in Neamul Șoimăreștilor; Sultana Mara Branković in Stephen the Great - Vaslui 1475
- Spouse: Mihai Brediceanu
- Parents: N. D. Cocea (father); Florica Mille (mother)

Dina Cocea (Romanian pronunciation: [ˈdina ˈkot͡ʃe̯a]; 27 November 1912 – 28 October 2008) was a Romanian stage actress and occasional movie star with a career that spanned 70 years. Among other activities, Cocea was an actor in residence at the National Theatre Bucharest for 17 years, a professor and Dean at the University of Bucharest, writer and columnist, playwright, political activist, and representative to UNESCO.

== Biography ==
Cocea was born on 27 November 1912 in Bucharest to father N. D. Cocea, a well-known writer and journalist, and mother Florica Mille, who was the daughter of another prominent journalist and writer, the socialist politico Constantin Mille, in whose house Cocea resided as a child. At 14 years of age, Cocea went to Paris, where she attended a Roman Catholic boarding school for a time. She later moved in with her aunt, Alice Cocéa, a film actress and star of the Parisian theatre, who introduced and encouraged Cocea to take up the acting profession.

After completing an education in the dramatic arts in Paris, Cocea returned to Romania where she debuted as an actress in 1934. In 1935, Cocea landed a role at Bucharest's Comedia ("Comedy"), a basement theater, (today the site of the Odeon Theater) alongside actor G. Timică in the play Adevăratul Iacob ("The Real Jacob"). She initially appeared using the stage name, "Dina Cerna" but she quickly dropped the pseudonym.

Cocea's first big success came when she played in Melchior Lengyel's 1909 play Taifunul ("Typhoon"). Cocea first screen appearance was in 1939's O noapte de pomină (An Unforgettable Night). In 1941 Cocea founded an acting troupe, Teatrul Nostru ("Our Theater") and took as partners, Fory Etterle, Eugenia Zaharia, and Peter Niro. The partnership lasted for 8 years but was dissolved by circumstance when the Comedia theater was nationalized by the communist authorities in 1948–1949. Cocea quickly became an actress in residence at the Bucharest National Theater, where she remained for 17 years until retiring in 1966. Spanning part of this period, from 1952 to 1962 Cocea, was Dean of the University of Bucharest's Faculty of Theater.

Following her retirement from the National Theater, Cocea appeared in many roles in other Bucharest theaters, from 1979 to 1989 acted as president of Asociația oamenilor din instituțiile teatrale și muzicale (ATM) (Association of Theatre Artists and Musicians), taught acting at university, and was a sometime political activist. She also appeared in a dozen films, up through the 1992 detective film Atac în bibliotecă (Attack in the Library), and represented Romania at UNESCO and at international congresses organized by the United Nations.

Despite acting in over 100 stage productions, a dozen films, being a regular television and radio guest, and being well known as a writer in Romania with a career spanning more than 50 years, Cocea was little known outside of Romania. However, in her home country she was a household name, having been dubbed Mare Doamnă a Teatrului ("Queen of the Theater"). In 2001, Cocea was presented with an honorary doctorate from the National University of Theatre and Film. In 2002, she was awarded the Order of the Star of Romania, the country's highest civil order awarded only by the President of Romania, and granted thereby the rank of Knight. She was married to composer Mihai Brediceanu.

Cocea died on 28 October 2008 of a heart attack, about a month shy of her 96th birthday, having entered Floreasca Hospital just days before suffering from a pulmonary infection. Following her death, former Romanian President, Ion Iliescu and Culture Minister Adrian Iorgulescu, among other dignitaries, expressed sorrow. On 30 October 2008, Cocea's body was laid in repose in the foyer of Bucharest's National Theatre where last respects were paid by dignitaries, actors such as Gheorghe Dinică, Marin Moraru, and Ion Caramitru, many of her former students, friends, and relatives, as well as students of the Caragiale Academy of Theatrical Arts and Cinematography On 31 October 2008 Cocea was interred at Bellu Cemetery, where she was given military honors at the funeral.

== Filmography ==
- Night in May (1934)
- O noapte de pomină (1939)
- Cartierul veseliei (1964)
- Neamul Șoimăreștilor (1964), as Elisabeta Movilă
- Ciprian Porumbescu (1972), as pastor Gorgon's sister
- Stephen the Great - Vaslui 1475 (1974), as Sultana Mara (Mara Branković)
- Mușchetarul român (1975)
- Aurel Vlaicu (1977)
- Iancu Jianu haiducul (1980)
- Cântec pentru fiul meu (1980)
- Atac în bibliotecă (1992), as Magda Comnoiu, Mihaela's mother
- Băieți buni (2005), as Aglaia
- Inimă de țigan (2007), as Agripina Dumbravă, Gigi Dumbravă's mother (Telenovela)
