= Barbu Ștefănescu Delavrancea =

Romanian writer (1858 - 1918)

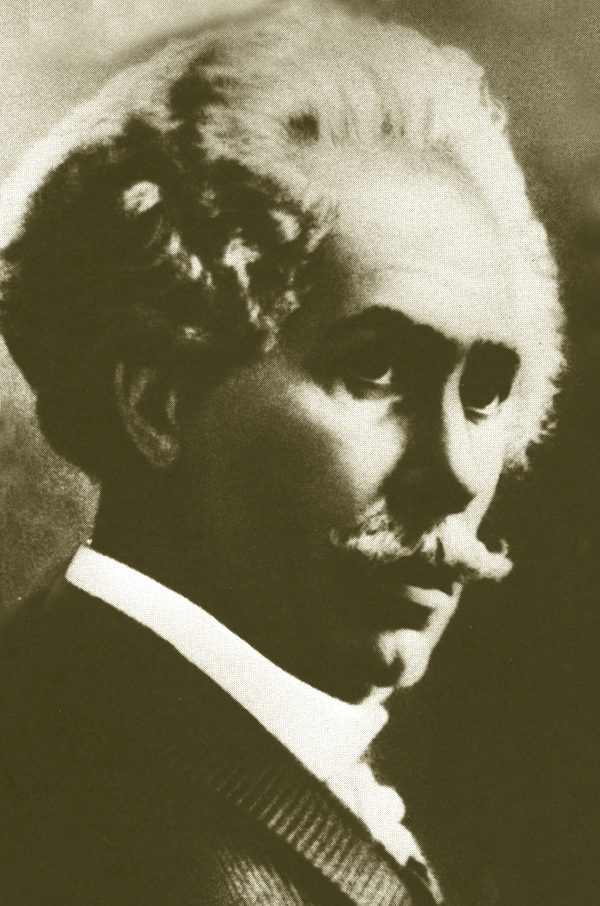
- Born: Barbu Ștefan; April 11, 1858; Delea Nouă (now part of Bucharest), Wallachia
- Died: April 29, 1918 (aged 60); Iași, Kingdom of Romania
- Resting place: Eternitatea Cemetery, Iași
- Education: University of Bucharest
- Occupations: Writer, orator, lawyer
- Years active: 1878–1914
- Notable work: The Troubadour, Mr. Vucea, Hagi Tudose, Sunset, The Storm
- Style: Poporanism
- Spouse: Ana Delavrancea
- Children: Cella Delavrancea; Henrieta Delavrancea; Niculina Delavrancea "Bebs" Delavrancea
- Parent(s): Ștefan Tudorică Albu (father); Iana (Ioana) (mother)

Mayor of Bucharest
- In office June 1899 – February 1901
- Preceded by: Nicolae Filipescu
- Succeeded by: Emil Costinescu

Minister of Public Works
- In office 29 December 1910 – 27 March 1912
- Prime Minister: Petre P. Carp
- Preceded by: Vasile Morțun
- Succeeded by: Ermil Pangrati

Minister of Industry and Commerce
- In office 10 July 1917 – 28 January 1918
- Prime Minister: Ion I. C. Brătianu
- Preceded by: Constantin Istrati
- Succeeded by: Ion Luca-Niculescu

Barbu Ștefănescu Delavrancea; pen name of Barbu Ștefan; April 11, 1858 – April 29, 1918) was a Romanian writer and poet, considered one of the greatest figures in the National awakening of Romania.

== Early life and studies ==
He was born on April 11, 1858, in Delea Nouă, then a village in Ilfov County, now a suburb of Bucharest. He was the ninth child of Ștefan Tudorică Albu and Iana (Ioana). His father originated from Vrancea County. Assigned to Sohatu, Ilfov County, he left Vrancea for Bucharest and became guildmaster of carters transporting grain from the scaffolds of Giurgiu and Oltenița. Barbu's mother was the daughter of widow Stana from Postovari, on the Filipescu estate.

Barbu Ștefănescu Delavrancea spent the first years of life with his father, then learned to read and write with deacon Ion Pestreanu from New St. George Church. In 1866, he enrolled in the Boys' School no. 4 directly in the second grade. Educator Spirache Dănilescu added the father's surname suffix "-escu", and thus the future writer bore the name Barbu Ștefănescu. In 1867 he transferred to the Royal School, where he followed the third and fourth classes. He attended the first class of high school at Gheorghe Lazăr, and the other seven classes at Saint Sava. In 1878 he enrolled in the Faculty of Law of the University of Bucharest. After graduating in 1882, he went for specialization in Paris, but failed to obtain his doctorate.

== Literary activity ==
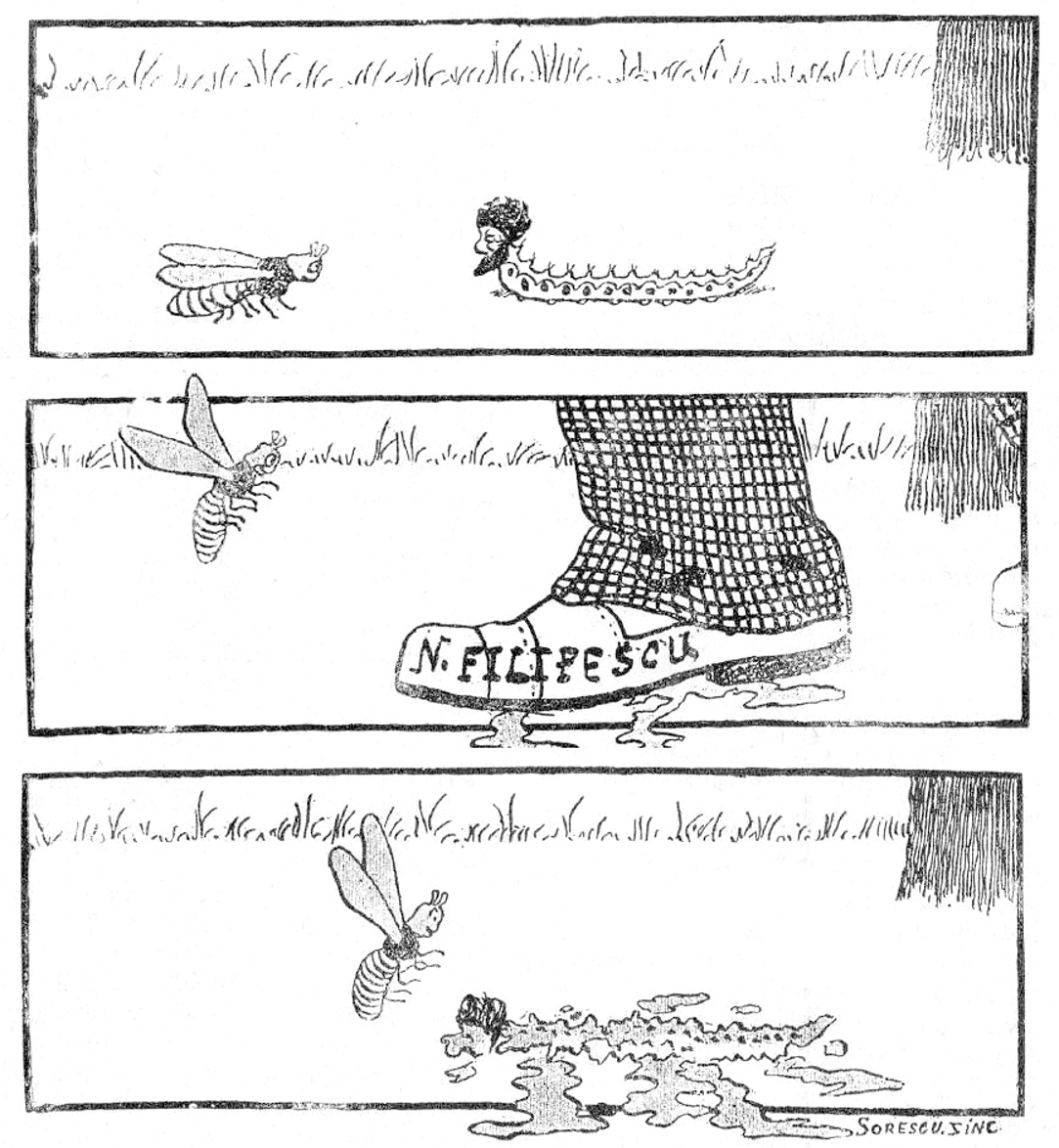
Cartoon targeting Barbu Ștefănescu Delavrancea.

In 1912 Barbu Ștefănescu Delavrancea became a titular member of the Romanian Academy. He worked as a substitute teacher at the Faculty of Letters of the University of Bucharest, journalist, lawyer (notable is the Caion trial, filed to Ion Luca Caragiale in conjunction with the paternity of drama The Scourge, when in the courtroom, to listen to the arguments of lawyers, was entered only upon invitation), and writer (novelist and playwright).

His publicistic activity consisted in collaboration with several newspapers, including România Liberă and Epoca (from 1884), whose editor he was. In 1887 he led, for a short period, Lupta Literară, and the following year he became editor of Bogdan Petriceicu Hasdeu's magazine Revista Nouă and a collaborator to Democrația and Voința națională. In 1893 he started working with Literatura și știința of Constantin Dobrogeanu-Gherea. Other publications to which he contributed were: Revista Literară, Familia, and Românul.

His literary debut occurred in 1877 with the patriotic poem Stante, part of the volume Poiana lungă, signed Barbu. In 1883 he debuted as a novelist with Sultănica, followed by Bunicul, Bunica, Domnul Vucea, and especially, Hagi Tudose (1903). In the following year he published under the pseudonym "Delavrancea". Drawing on Romanian folklore, he published several tales: Neghiniță, Palatul de cleștar, Dăparte, dăparte, Moș Crăciun, etc.

Barbu Ștefănescu Delavrancea is widely known especially for his historical trilogy, Apus de soare (1909), Viforul (1910), and Luceafărul (1910), works full of romantic breath.

== As politician ==
As a politician, he held the following offices:

- Mayor of Bucharest (June 1899 – February 1901).
- Vice President of the Chamber of Deputies (elected 1899).
- Minister of Public Works (December 29, 1910 – March 27, 1912).
- Minister of Industry and Commerce (from July 10, 1917 – January 28, 1918).

== Personal life ==
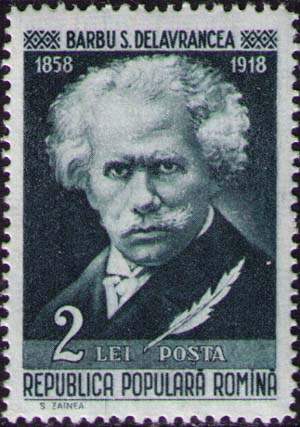
1958 stamp of Barbu Ștefănescu Delavrancea

He married Maria Delavrancea, with whom he had four children, including Cella Delavrancea and Henrieta Delavrancea. He died in 1918 in Iași and was buried in the city's Eternitatea Cemetery.
