= Boldizsár Csiky =

Romanian composer

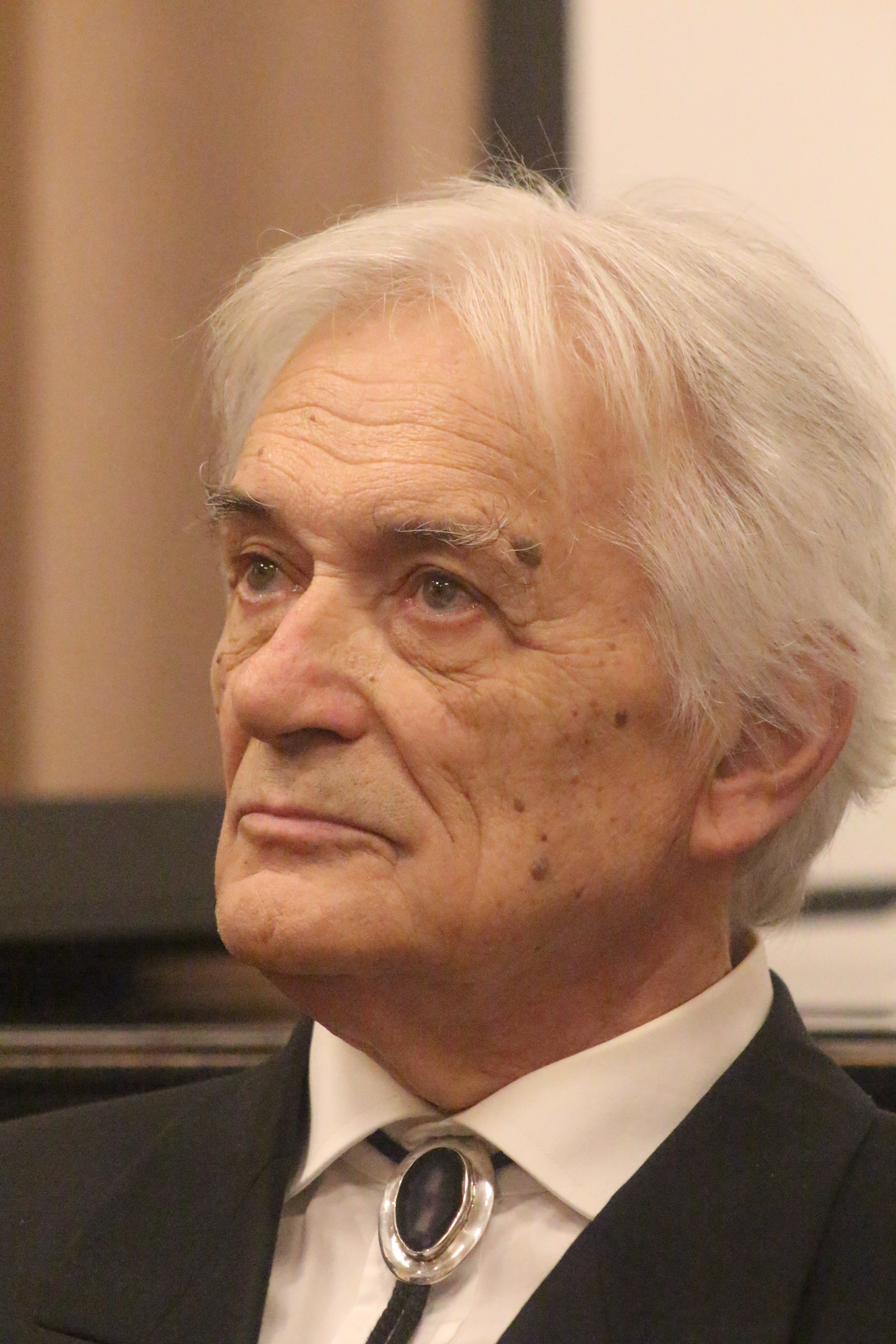

Boldizsár Csiky (born October 3, 1937) is a Romanian composer of Hungarian ethnicity. He was born in Târgu Mureș and began his musical studies at the Târgu Music School (1954–1955) before further study at the Conservatory in Cluj (1955–1961). He was awarded the Composers' Union Award in 1971, Romanian Academy Award in 1980 and the "Bartók – Pásztory" award at the Franz Liszt Academy of Music, Budapest in 1984. He was Director of Târgu Mureș Symphony Hall between 1990–1997 and professor of chamber music at the Music School in Târgu Mureș (1961–1970)
