= Cella Delavrancea =

Romanian pianist, writer and educator

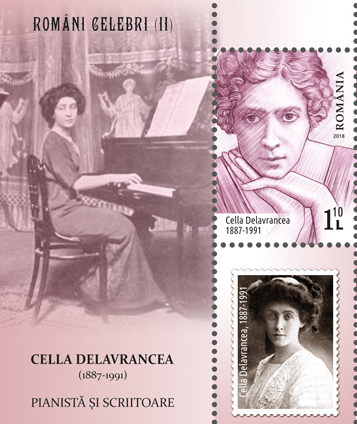
- Delavrancea on a 2018 stamp sheet of Romania
- Born: 15 December 1887; Bucharest, Kingdom of Romania
- Died: 9 August 1991 (aged 103); Bucharest
- Resting place: Bellu Cemetery, Bucharest
- Occupations: Pianist, writer, teacher of piano
- Spouse(s): Viorel Tilea; Aristide Blank; Philippe Lahovary
- Parent(s): Barbu Ștefănescu Delavrancea (father); Maria Lupașcu (mother)

Cella Delavrancea (15 December 1887 – 9 August 1991) was a Romanian pianist, writer and teacher of piano, eldest daughter of writer Barbu Ștefănescu Delavrancea, sister of architect Henrieta Delavrancea-Gibory, Niculina Delavrancea and "Bebs" Delavrancea, member of the circle of Eugen Lovinescu. She was married to diplomat Viorel Tilea during World War I (divorced), to Aristide Blank (divorced), and to Philippe Lahovary, and was one of the intimate friends of Queen Marie of Romania. She's also known for her romantic relationship with Nae Ionescu, Romanian logician and politician, spiritual mentor of the "Eliade generation" (meaning the mentor of extremists and anti-Semites).

== Biography ==
Daughter of writer Barbu Ștefănescu Delavrancea and Maria Lupașcu, she studied piano first with her mother, then at the Conservatories of Bucharest and Paris. She was considered by Ion Luca Caragiale, after hearing her playing a waltz by Chopin, at 14 years old, in Vienna, "a wonder child, Cella Delavrancea, who tames a wild monster: the Art". She was deeply influenced by family, as she said herself, "I was raised in an atmosphere in which they spoke only of literature, art and music". She concerts throughout Europe alongside great artists, often in duet with George Enescu. Between 1950 and 1954 she worked as a teacher at the School of Music in Bucharest, and since 1954, at the Conservatory, where she launched a series of famous pianists as Nicolae Licăreț, Dan Grigore or Radu Lupu.

In 1929, she started in literature in Tudor Arghezi's magazine, Bilete de papagal, collaborating after 1935 with magazines Cuvântul, Muzică și poezie, Timpul, Curentul, România Literară, Revista Fundațiilor Regale, etc. and, after 1950, at Contemporanul, Gazeta literară or Secolul XX. Her main works, short stories, novels or memoirs, are Vraja (1946), Mozaic în timp (1973), O vară ciudată (1975), Dintr-un secol de viață (1987), etc. She was the first Romanian artist who participated in a gala concert organized to celebrate the centenary of her own in 1987, at the Romanian Athenaeum, in which she played with her student and friend Dan Grigore. She was buried in Bellu Cemetery.
