= Caius Brediceanu =

Romanian politician and diplomat

Caius Brediceanu (April 25, 1879–1953) was a Romanian politician and diplomat.

== Biography ==
Caius Brediceanu was born in Lugoj, the second son of Coriolan Brediceanu. He started his studies in Lugoj, continuing them in the German gymnasium in Sebeș, the German lyceum in Sibiu, and thereafter in Bucharest and Iași. In 1896 he started studying medicine at the University of Vienna, but changed his mind and switched to Law School where he got his doctor's degree in Law and Political Sciences. He also attended courses of philosophy at the University of Paris.

Returning to Banat, he started a political career. He participated at the Great National Assembly of Alba Iulia in December 1918, being elected member of the High National Romanian Council of Transylvania. After the unification of Transylvania and Romania, he was appointed undersecretary of state of the Ministry of Foreign Affairs. In 1919 he was member of the Romanian delegation to the Paris Peace Conference, representing the interests of the province of Banat.

In 1921 he was appointed a Minister of State for Transylvania and Banat in the Take Ionescu government. He then entered the diplomatic corps being subsequently:

- minister plenipotentiary in Rio de Janeiro (covering the Romanian relations with Brazil, Argentina and Chile (1923–1927));
- minister plenipotentiary to the Vatican (1927–1930);
- minister plenipotentiary in Vienna (1931–1936).

He was the brother of Tiberiu Brediceanu, Sempronia, and Cornelia, Lucian Blaga's wife.

Caius Brediceanu died in 1953 in Lădești, Vâlcea County.
