= Gheorghe Dima National Music Academy =

Coordinates: 46.76873°N 23.593262°E

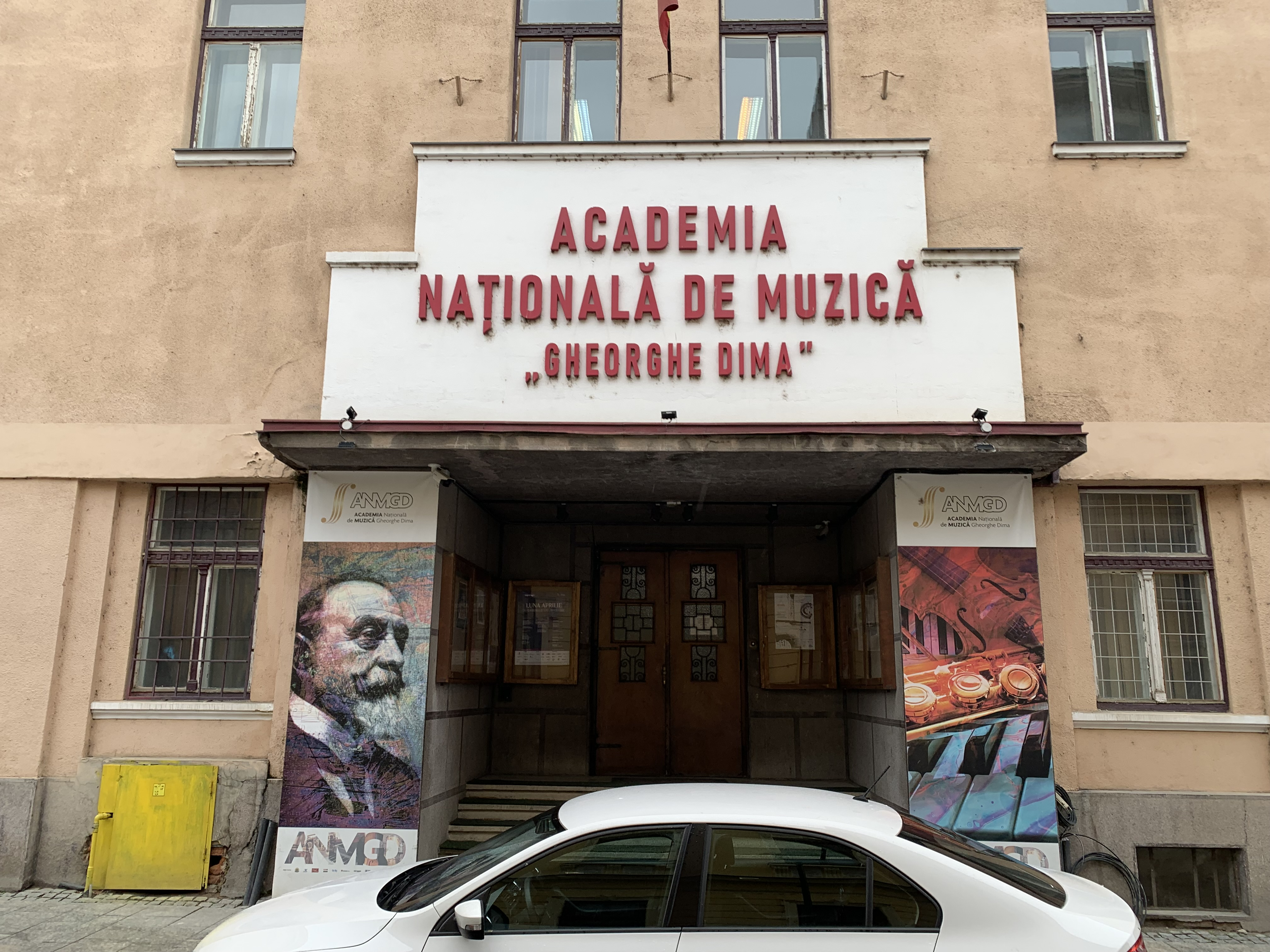
The Gheorghe Dima Music Academy

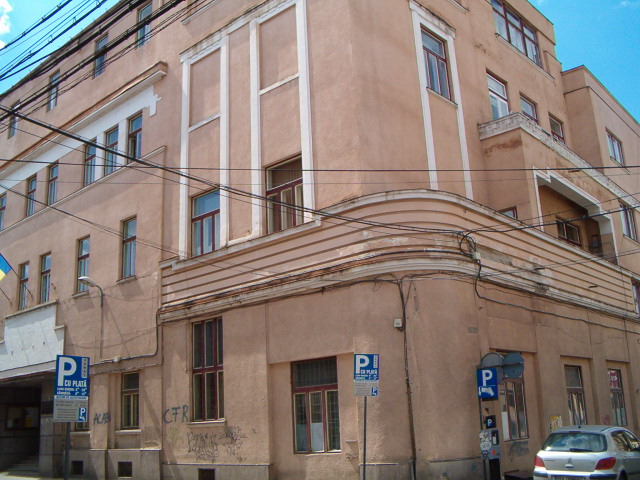
The Gheorghe Dima Music Academy

Gheorghe Dima National Music Academy is an educational institution located in Cluj-Napoca, Romania. The institution was founded in 1919, and currently comprises various departments including composition, conducting, musicology, musical pedagogy, canto, choreographic pedagogy, and opera. Notable alumni include Alexandru Agache, Christian Wilhelm Berger, Gheorghe Ciobanu, Boldizsár Csiky, Anita Hartig, Irina Hasnaș, György Ligeti, Mariana Nicolesco, Tiberiu Olah, Sigismund Toduță, and Adela Zaharia.

== See also ==
- List of universities in Romania
