= Tiberiu Brediceanu =

Romanian composer

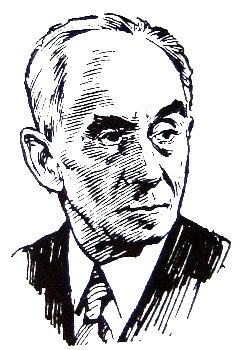
- Born: April 2, 1877; Lugoj, Austria-Hungary
- Died: December 19, 1968 (aged 91); Bucharest, SR Romania
- Occupation: Composer
- Children: Mihai Brediceanu
- Father: Coriolan Brediceanu

Tiberiu Brediceanu (April 2, 1877 – December 19, 1968) was a Romanian composer and a corresponding member of the Romanian Academy.

== Biography ==
Born in Lugoj, Romania, to Coriolan Brediceanu, Tiberiu Brediceanu studied music in Lugoj (1884–1891), Košice (1891–1892), Blaj, Sibiu (1892–1895), and Brașov (1903–1906). He worked as a general manager of the Bucharest Opera House. He composed symphonic dances, as well as songs and ballads for both voice and piano. He also published a collection of 170 folk melodies and wrote several works on Romanian folk songs.

Brediceanu was elected corresponding member of the Romanian Academy in May 1937. In 1948, the communist regime had him removed from the academy, but he was reinstated in 1990, after the fall of the regime.

He was the brother of Caius, Sempronia, and Cornelia (Lucian Blaga's wife), and the father of the composer and conductor Mihai Brediceanu.

He died in Bucharest in 1968. Streets in Bistrița, Cluj-Napoca, and Lugoj and a park in Brașov are named after him.
