= Coriolan Brediceanu =

Austro-Hungarian lawyer and politician of Romanian ethnicity

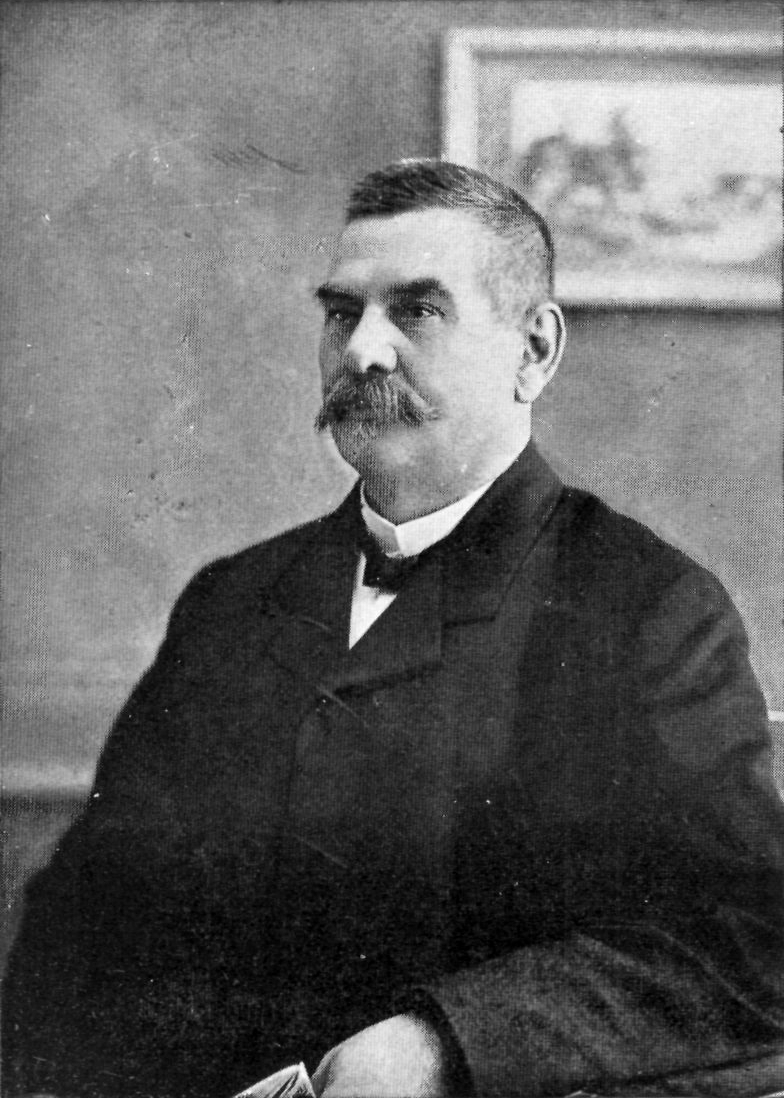
Coriolan Brediceanu

Coriolan Brediceanu (1849–1909) was an Austro-Hungarian lawyer and politician of Romanian ethnicity. Born in Lugoj, his children included Caius and Tiberiu.

== Biography ==
Brediceanu was born in Lugoj, the son of the soap maker Vasile Brediceanu, and the nephew of George Brediceanu, a banished boyar from Austrian Oltenia who settled in Banat. He studied at Beiuș High School and then attended the University of Budapest, where in 1874, he obtained his lawyer's diploma. After graduation, he returned to Lugoj where he lived to the end of his life. In Lugoj, he opened a law firm and soon became well known for how he defended the peasantry in trials that the majority of lawyers refused to take. Another fact was that Brediceanu did not take honorariums from the poor persons. In 1896, he defended the peasants from Mehadia or miners from Ciclova Montant in the trials initiated by Hungarian authorities. It was also confirmed, that Brediceanu defended intellectuals, such as writers and journalists sued by the Hungarian authorities for the criticism and favoritism to Romanian side. As for the politic side, Brediceanu was highly involved in defending the rights of Romanians, and in 1894, in Cluj, along with the other 30 lawyers, he defended the Transylvanian Memorandum of the Romanian National Party Central Committee, of which he has also been a member.
