= Transylvania State Philharmonic Orchestra =

The Transylvania State Philharmonic Orchestra (Romanian: Filarmonica de Stat Transilvania) or Cluj-Napoca Philharmonic, based in Cluj-Napoca, has grown to a valuable institution of music, having a sustained presence in the Romanian and European cultural space.

== History ==
As an artistic institution dedicated exclusively to concert activities, The Cluj-Napoca Philharmonic was founded through an official decree of Romania’s Council of Ministers, in the autumn of 1955, carrying the name "The Transylvania State Philharmonic Cluj-Napoca". At that time, the symphonic orchestra had 75 musicians and the ensemble of traditional music had 20 members. Under the supervision of Maestro Wilhelm Demian, the members of the new institution were selected. Maestro Antonin Ciolan was appointed principal conductor of the symphonic ensemble. The first concert took place on December 4, 1955.

Nonetheless, the tradition of symphonic activity in Cluj-Napoca has its history since the beginning of the 19th century, maintained by associations like The Orchestra of the Cluj-Napoca National Theatre, Music Society and Music Circle. During the inter-war period, there ware series of symphonic events, sustained by the orchestras of the Cluj-Napoca Romanian Opera, Hungarian Theatre and by an orchestra belonging to the city’s Jewish community, called "Goldmark Orchestra". In 1947, there was the first attempt to found a concert institution – The "Ardealul" Philharmonic, which had a short existence of two seasons, but which set the basis for what the cultural life in Cluj-Napoca was to become.

Due to Maestro Ciolan’s experience and the training of the young musicians from the Music Academy in Cluj-Napoca (called the Music Conservatory at that time), the Philharmonic’s progress was extremely fast. It soon became an important name among the national artistic values.

In 1966, the Chamber Orchestra was founded, under the baton of the well-known Mircea Cristescu. In 1965, the Philharmonic organized the first edition of its own yearly festival, Cluj Musical Autumn. In 1972, under the composer Sigismund Toduță’s directorship, the Philharmonic’s Choir was founded and trained by Maestro Dorin Pop, followed by Florentin Mihăescu and Cornel Groza.

The choir as a whole provided voices to the soundtrack of the 2004 film The Passion of The Christ.

== See also ==
- Academic College

== Notes ==
- "Mai bine parc decat filarmonica". Clujeanul. 2008-06-13. Archived from the original on 2008-06-14.
- "Petitie impotriva defrisarii arborilor seculari din Parcul Central al Clujului". Petitii Online. 2008-06-20.
