= Mihai Brediceanu =

Romanian composer, conductor, and musicologist

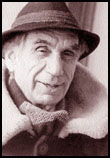
- Born: June 14, 1920; Brașov, Kingdom of Romania
- Died: March 4, 2005 (aged 84); Focșani, Romania
- Resting place: Lugoj
- Education: National University of Music Bucharest
- Occupations: Composer, conductor and musicologist
- Spouse: Dina Cocea
- Awards: National Order of Faithful Service; Order of the Star of Romania, Knight rank

Mihai Brediceanu (14 June 1920 – 4 March 2005) was a Romanian composer, conductor, and musicologist.

== Biography ==
He was born in Brașov, the son of composer Tiberiu Brediceanu and grandson of Coriolan Brediceanu. He studied the piano at the Brașov Conservatory, and music theory, composition and conducting at the National University of Music Bucharest. His teachers were Mihail Jora, Marțian Negrea, Florica Musicescu, Silvia Șerbescu, and Ionel Perlea. He also pursued graduate courses in law and mathematics at the University of Bucharest.

From 1959 to 1966, Brediceanu was director general of the Romanian National Opera, Bucharest, from 1969 to 1971 musical director of the Syracuse Symphony Orchestra in New York, and by 1975 a professor at Syracuse University. Between 1978 and 1980, he was director general of Opera in Istanbul and between 1982 and 1990, director general of the George Enescu Philharmonic Orchestra. In 1991, he was appointed the new director general of the National Opera, Bucharest.

In addition to numerous pieces of music for the theatre, Brediceanu composed a symphony, four symphonic dances, a suite for chamber orchestra, choral works, chamber music, and songs.

In 2001 he was awarded the Order of the Star of Romania, Knight rank by President Ion Iliescu. Brediceanu was an honorary citizen of the city of Lugoj.

He was married to actress Dina Cocea.
