= Virginia Andreescu Haret =

Romanian architect

- Born: Maria Virginia Andreescu; 21 June 1894; Bucharest, Romania
- Died: 6 May 1962 (aged 67); Bucharest, Romania
- Occupation: architect
- Years active: 1923–1947
- Known for: First Romanian woman to graduate with a degree in architecture First Romanian Architectural Inspector General

Virginia Andreescu Haret (1894–1962) was a Romanian architect and is credited as the first woman to graduate with a degree in architecture in Romania. She is also the first woman to reach the rank of Romanian Architectural Inspector General.

== Biography ==
Maria Virginia Andreescu was born on 21 June 1894 in Bucharest, Romania, and was the niece of the painter Ion Andreescu. Her mother died when she was nine years old and Andreescu took charge at that point for raising her three younger siblings. In 1912, she graduated from high school at the Mihai Viteazul High School. She enrolled in the Superior School of Architecture and was the first woman to graduate with a degree in architecture in 1919, having earned the highest distinction award "very good". Simultaneously with her studies for a degree in architecture, Andreescu was attending the Academy of Fine Arts, studying under Ipolit Strâmbu. In 1920, Strâmbu organized a showing of 66 of Andreescu's works including drawings, sketches, and watercolors. They were well received and Historical Monuments Commission bought 28 of them for permanent display.

In 1922, she undertook a study trip of the architecture of the Kingdom of Serbs, Croats and Slovenes and returned with a report, which was published in Fine Arts. Using the money she had gotten from the sale of her works to the Monuments Commission, Andreescu then went to Italy to further her education in Rome. She studied for a year and a half with Professor Gr. Bargelini, also working with archaeologists to understand traditional building methods. The Novecento Italiano movement, which was popular at that time, can be seen as an influence in her later works. After completing her studies in Rome, Andreescu returned to Romania in the second half of 1923 and began working at the Ministry of Technical Education, where she worked until her retirement in 1947. In 1928 she married Spiru I. Haret, (1892-1970), nephew of the engineer and mathematician Spiru C. Haret. The couple had one child, Radu, who became an engineer.

Her most prolific period of building occurred between the World Wars. She built many projects including the Gheorghe Șincai High School (1924-1928), a wing of the Cantemir Vodă National College (1926-1929), the Govora Casino (1928-1929), as well as many private homes monuments and public and private buildings. Her style varies encompassing all of the Romanian architectural styles from classical to modern which were present in the early 20th century. Her own home was built in the Art Deco style, for which she seemed to have a personal preference. After having built some 40 buildings, she received the designation as Romanian Architectural Inspector General, the first woman to have served in this capacity. She represented her country at many conferences and Congresses, including the International Architecture Congresses, in Brussels, Moscow, Paris, and Rome, and she received many awards for her designs. In addition to building, she wrote a history of architecture with Nicolae Ghica-Budești in four volumes, complete with watercolors.

Haret died on 6 May 1962 in Bucharest.

== Works ==
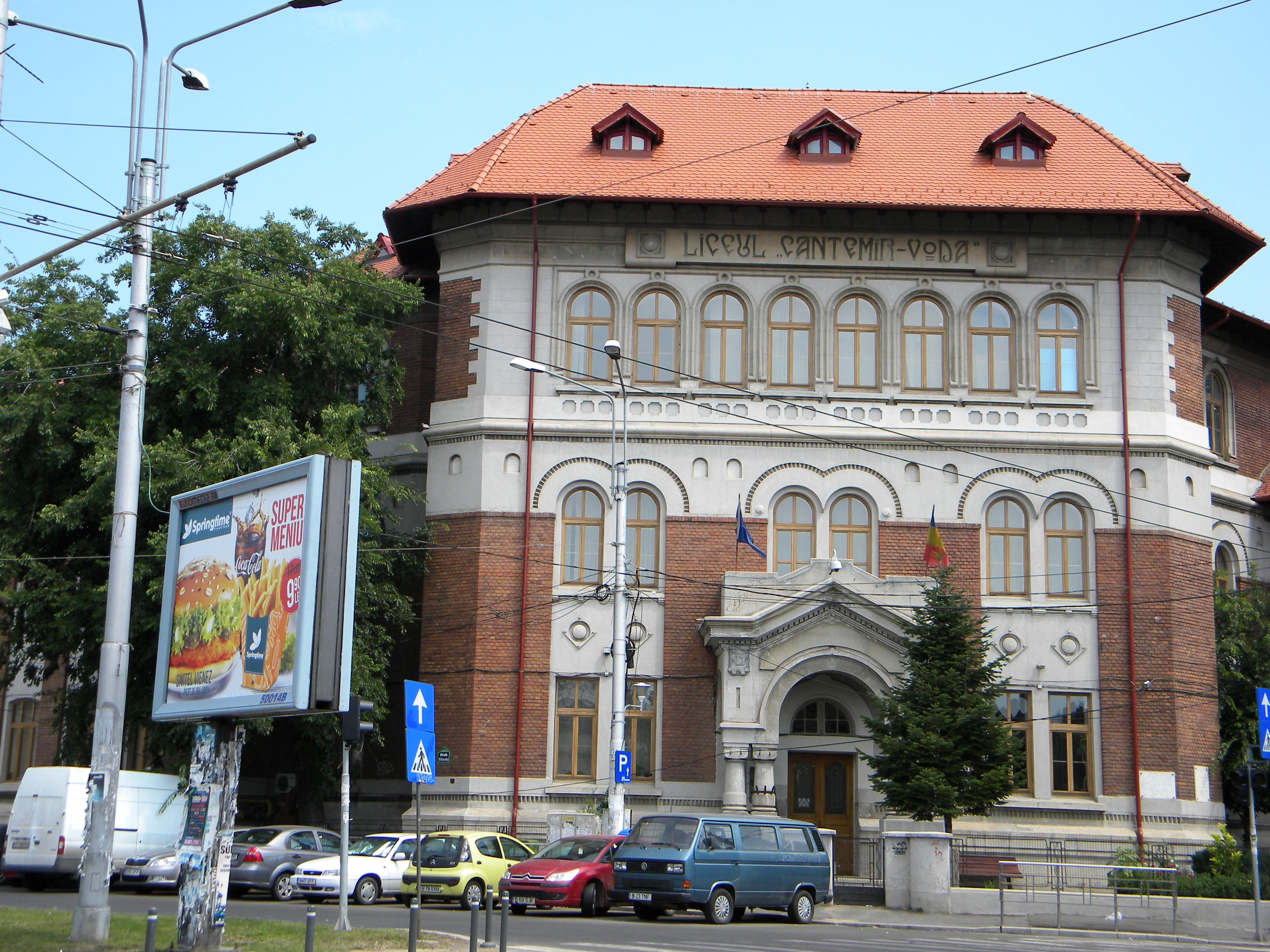
Dimitrie Cantemir High School

- 1923, Nicu Stănescu Villa, #43 Strada Paris
- 1923, Dionisie Germani Villa, #45 Strada Paris
- 1923-1927, Palace for the Tinerimea Română Society, #19 Strada Johann Guttenberg
- 1924-1928, Gheorghe Șincai High School
- 1924-1928 Apartment, #50-56 Strada Frumoasă
- 1924, Gongopol Building, #40 Strada Icoanei
- 192?, I. Catuniari Villa, #30 Strada Washington
- 1925, Papiniu Villas, #54 and #56 Strada Roma
- 1925, Dimitrie Cantemir High School, #117 Bulevardul Dacia
- 1926, P. Leibovici Villa, #5 Intrarea Spătarului
- 1926, Spiru Haret-Gold Villa, #8 Intrarea Spătarului
- 1926, Locuințe Ieftine Company Building, #1 Bulevardul Hristo Botev
- 1926-1929, wing of Cantemir Vodă National College
- 1927, Ziarul Universul Villa, #5 Strada Madrid
- 1927-1934, Biserica Sfânta Treime Ghencea Church, jointly with Jean Pompilian
- 1927, Anthropology Research Center for the Carol Davila University of Medicine and Pharmacy, #8 Bulevardul Eroli Sanitari
- 1928-1929, Govora Casino
- 1928, Col. Cezar Goliel Villa, #16 Strada Dr. Mihail Obedenaru
- 1928, Ianculescu (Rosetti) Villa, #1-3 Strada Povernei
- 1928, Wine Warehouse and living quarters for Banca Viticolă, #17-21 Strada Petru Rareș
- 1928, Augustin Opran Villa, #15 Strada Alexandru Philippide
- 1929, Dr. Nicolae Gheorghe Lupu Villa, #41 Bulevardul Dacia
- 1929, Seven Villas for the clerks of the Casa de Depuneri și Consemanațiuni, #2-10 Strada Theodor Burada
- 1930, Steinberg Villa, #31 Strada Dr. Joseph Lister
- 1930, Georgescu Villa, #41 Strada Dr. Louis Pasteur
- 1930, Prof. Popsecu and Iosif Gavrea Villa, #6 & 6a Strada Mihail Obedenaru
- 1931, Virginia and Spiru Haret Villa, #14 Bulevardul Lascăr Catargiu
- 1932, Radu and Elena Perianu Villa, #18 Bulevardul Eroilor
- 1933, Viorica and Gheorghe Rujinski Vila, #22 Strada Berzei
- 1935, Nistor Villa, #17 Strada Dr. Anibal Theohari
- 1935, Iurașcu Villa, #24 Strada Emanoil Porumbaru
- 1935, Panait Mazilu Villa, #76 Strada Popa Savu
- 1936, Constantinescu Villa #11 Intrarea Bitolia
- 1937, Dumitru Stoica Villa, #27 Strada Veronica Micle
- 1942, Constanța and Ioan G. Haret Villa, #7 Strada Jean Texier

== Sources ==
- Dan, Maria Bostenaru (2013). Interwar Architecture with Reinforced Concrete Structure Exposed to Multihazard in European Context: Intervention in the Romanian and Italian Context. Münster, Germany: LIT Verlag. ISBN 978-3-643-90366-2.
- Lăcraru, Răzvan; Lăcraru, Mihaela (2013). Traseu Arhitectural Virginia Andreescu Haret Architecture Tour. Romanian Chamber of Architects. ISBN 978-973-145-299-9. Archived from the original on 2016-03-20.
