= Sigismund Toduță =

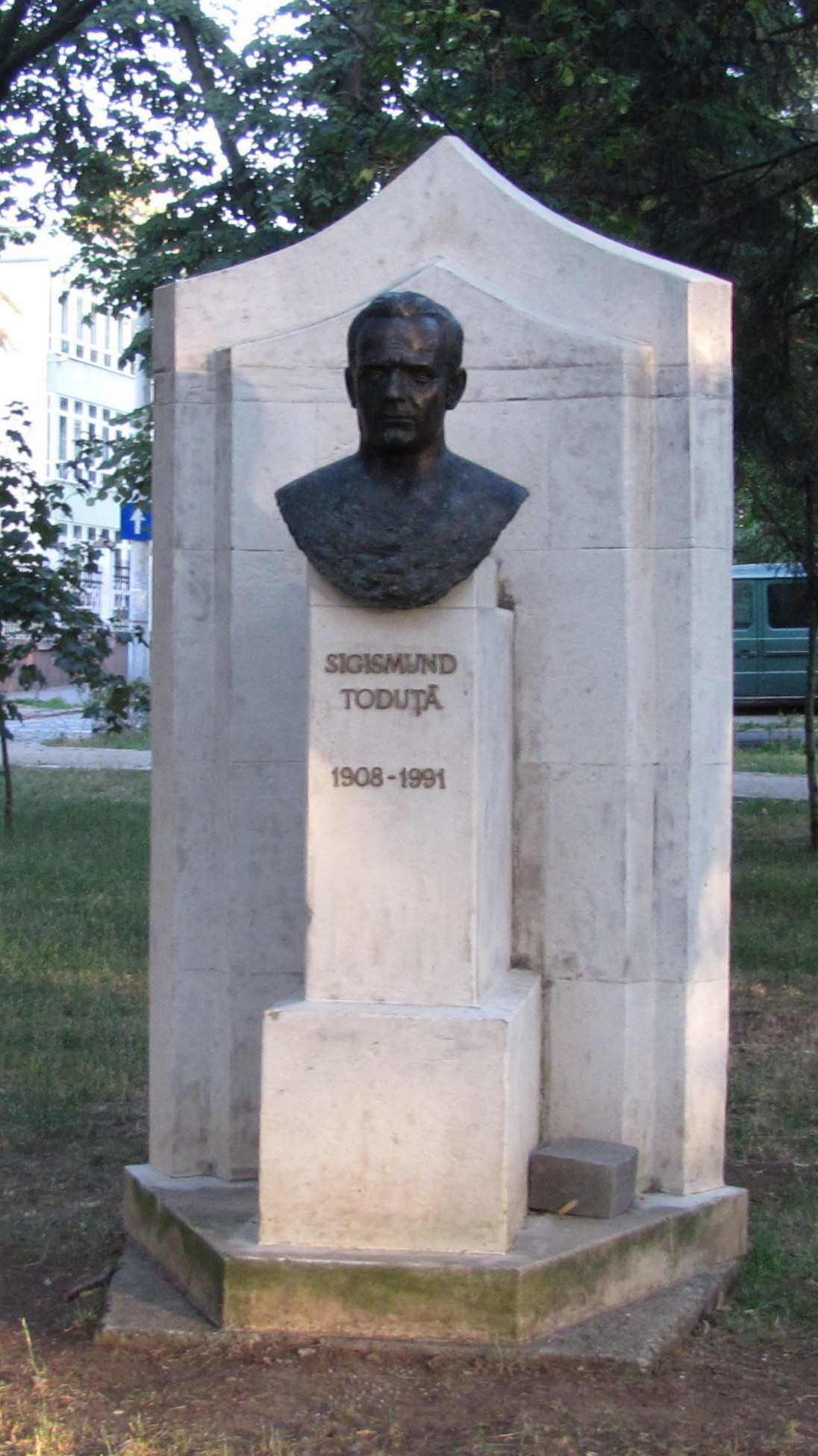
- Monument to Sigismund Toduță in Central Park Simion Bărnuțiu, Cluj-Napoca
- Born: 17 May 1908; Simeria, Austria-Hungary
- Died: 3 July 1991 (aged 83); Cluj-Napoca, Romania
- Education: Gheorghe Dima National Music Academy

Sigismund Toduță (17 May 1908 in Simeria – 3 July 1991 in Cluj-Napoca) was a Romanian composer, musicologist, and professor.

== Biography ==
Toduță graduated from the Conservatory of Music and Dramatic Art in Cluj in 1936. His instructors included Ecaterina Fotino-Negru (piano) and Marțian Negrea (composition).

Between 1936 and 1938, he continued his music studies in Rome, Italy, at the Accademia Nazionale di Santa Cecilia with Ildebrando Pizetti (composition) and Alfredo Casella (piano). In 1938, he obtained a PhD in musicology at the Pontifical Institute for Sacred Music. He then became a music teacher at the Saint Vasile High School in Blaj until 1943. Between 1945 and 1949, Toduță was artistic director for the "Ardealul" Philharmonic in Cluj. He then worked as a theory and solfege professor at the G. Dima Conservatory. Between 1971 and 1974, he conducted the State Philharmonic in Cluj.

In March 1991 he was elected corresponding member of the Romanian Academy.

== Selected works ==
=== Vocal symphonic music ===
- Mass for mixed choir with organ accompaniment (1937)
- Psalm 97 for mixed choir, soloists and orchestra (1938–39)
- Psalm 133 for choir, soloists and orchestra
- Children sing - Suite for chorus of equal voices and string orchestra, lyrics by Ana Voileanu-Nicoară (1960)
- The ballad of the flag - for soprano, mixed choir and orchestra, lyrics by Victor Tulbure (1961)
- Miorița - ballad-oratory for soloists, mixed choir and orchestra, popular lyrics (1978)
- In the footsteps of Horea - oratory for soloists, mixed choir and orchestra, popular lyrics (1978)
- Meșterul Manole - opera-oratory in three acts, after the eponymous drama by Lucian Blaga (1980–83)

=== Symphonic and concert music ===
- Egloga for large orchestra (1933)
- Three Symphony Sketches for the Big Orchestra (1936)
- Symphony variations for large orchestra (1940)
- Concert (no.1) for piano and orchestra (1943)
- 4 Taps for String Orchestra, by Valentin Greff Bakfark (1950)
- Entertainment for String Orchestra (1951)
- Concert no.1 for string orchestra (1951)
- Symphony I (1954)
- Second Symphony in D minor, with organ, "In memory of George Enescu" (1955)
- Symphony III "Ovidiu" (1957)
- Festive opening (1959)
- Symphony to Go (1962/75)
- Concert for blowers and percussion (1970/1976)
- Concert no.2 for string orchestra (1972–73)
- Concert no.3 for string orchestra "in antico stil" (1974)
- Old prints for string orchestra (1974)
- Symphony "in ancient style" (1977)
- Concerto no.4 for string orchestra (1980)
- Concert for flute and string orchestra (1983)
- Concert (no.2) for piano and orchestra (1986)
- Concert for oboe and string orchestra (1989)

=== Instrumental chamber music ===
- String Quartet (1936)
- Prelude to the piano
- Father Hubic seen by Dr. S. Toduța, for piano (1941)
- Passacaglia for piano (1943)
- 3 Sketches for piano (1944)
- Piano Sonatina (1950)
- Suite of songs and dances for piano (1951)
- Sonata for flute and piano (1952)
- 10 Carols for the Piano (1952)
- Sonata for cello and piano (1952)
- Sonata (no.1) for violin and piano (1953)
- Adagio for cello and piano (1954)
- Sonata for oboe and piano (1955)
- 4 Sketches for Harp (1958)
- 4 Pieces of flat stone (c. 1958)
- 6 Pieces for piano (c. 1960)
- Train for piano (1970)
- Prelude - Choral - Toccata for piano (1973–1974)
- Piano holders (1975)
- Joko - 4 Pieces for Harp (1978)
- Sonata no.2 for violin and piano (1981)
- Sonatina for violin and piano (1981)
- 6 pieces for solo oboe (1981)
- BACH Symphony for Organ (1984)
- 7 Choral Preludes for Organ (1985)
- Recitativo - for piano (c. 1985)
- Sonata no.2 for flute and piano (1987–88)
- Sonata for solo flute (1989)
- Sonata for solo cello (1989)

=== Choral music ===
- Liturgy (no.1) St. John the Golden Mouth for mixed choir (1937)
- Psalm 23 for mixed choir (1937)
- Psalm 97 - for mixed choir and organ (1938)
- Psalm 133 - for soloists, choir, and orchestra (1939)
- Arhaisme - for mixed choir, lyrics by Mihail Celarianu (1942/1968)
- 20 Choirs - for equal voices (1958–59)
- 5 Banat songs - for equal male voices (1955–58)
- 10 Mixed Choirs (1950–56)
- 15 mixed choirs (1969)
- Triptych - for equal voices, lyrics Ana Voileanu-Nicoară (1951)
- The cloud - for equal voices, lyrics Vlaicu Bârna (1951)
- Swing song - in the form of a canon for equal voices (1955)
- Hymn for peace - for children's choir, with piano accompaniment, Vlaicu Bârna lyrics (1956)
- Codrule, when I passed you - for male voices (1960)
- Heights - for male voices, lyrics by Ștefan Bitan (1961)
- 2 Madrigals - on Dante lyrics for mixed choir (1965)
- 6 Popular Songs (1973)
- At the river of Babylon - for mixed choir (1974)
- Liturgy (no.2) (1974)
- Song for pioneers for children's choir and piano, lyrics by Ana Voileanu-Nicoară (1976)
- At the courtyards of longing - 3 madrigals on lyrics by Lucian Blaga (1978)
- 4 Madrigals - on lyrics by Lucian Blaga for mixed choir (1981)
- 10 Choral thumbnails - for equal voices, popular lyrics
- 3 Choirs - for equal voices, lyrics Lucian Blaga (1986)
- Doina 1, Doina 2, Play - for equal voices and piano, popular lyrics (1985)
- 2 choirs for equal voices Ana Blandiana (1989–90)
- Sleeping birds, lyrics Mihai Eminescu (1943)
- Your Silence, lyrics by Octavian Goga (1943)
- Rainbow of love, lyrics Mihai Beniuc (1947)
- Sponges, lyrics Vlaicu Bârna (1951)
- 4 Popular Songs - for Voice and Piano (1953)
- 14 Lieder - for voice and piano, lyrics Lucian Blaga (1984)
- 16 Lieder - for voice and piano, lyrics Ana Blandiana (1987)
- 5 Lieder - for voice (S) and piano verses by William Shakespeare, Franz von Schober, Rainer Maria Rilke, Charles Baudelaire, Eugenio Montale (1987)
- 5 Lieder - for voice (Bar or Ms) and piano, lyrics by Lucian Blaga (1983/1988)
