= List of Romanian inventors and discoverers =

This is a list of Romanian Inventions and Discoveries of Romanian people or inventors/discoverers of Romanian heritage in alphabetical order.

== A ==
- Ion I. Agârbiceanu: designer of the first gas laser in Romania.
- Andrei Alexandrescu: pioneering work on policy-based design implemented via template metaprogramming; co-inventor of D programming language.
- Ana Aslan: inventor of Gerovital, an anti-aging product widely used by famous personalities, such as Charles de Gaulle, John F. Kennedy, Indira Gandhi, Charlie Chaplin and Salvador Dalí.
- Gheorghe Atanasiu: inventor of infrared monochromator and creator of the method of optical determination of heat of dissociation.
- Ion Atanasiu: known as the originator of cerimetry, an analytical method based on cerium (IV) as titration reagent.

== B ==
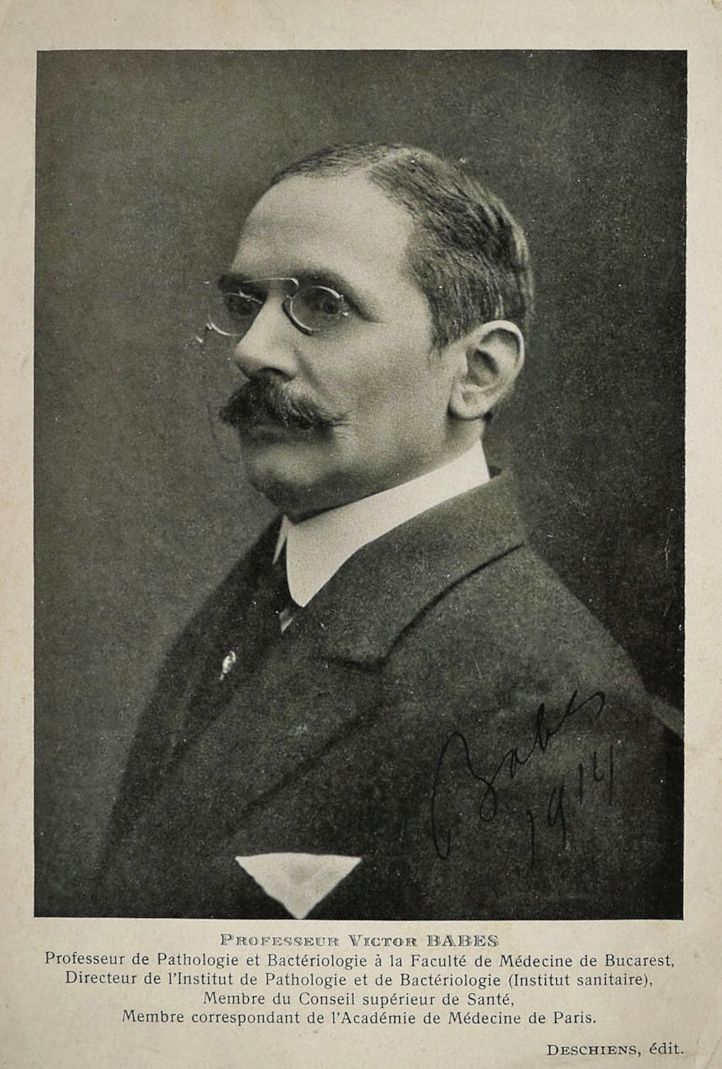
Victor Babeș

- Aurel Babeș: discovered the vaginal smear as screening test for cervical cancer.
- Victor Babeș: he discovered a parasitic sporozoan of the ticks, named Babesia (of the genus Babesiidae), and which causes a rare and severe disease called babesiosis; he also discovered cellular inclusions in rabies-infected nerve cells.
- Emanoil Bacaloglu: he is known for the "Bacaloglu pseudosphere". This is a surface of revolution for which the "Bacaloglu curvature" is constant.
- Radu Bălescu: he worked on the statistical physics of charged particles (Bălescu-Lenard collision operator).
- Alexandra Bellow: made substantial contributions to the fields of ergodic theory, probability and analysis.
- George de Bothezat: inventor of the quadrotor helicopter (The Flying Octopus). He is considered one of the founders of aircraft flight dynamics.
- Ștefan Burileanu: inventor of the Burileanu antiaircraft cannon.

== C ==
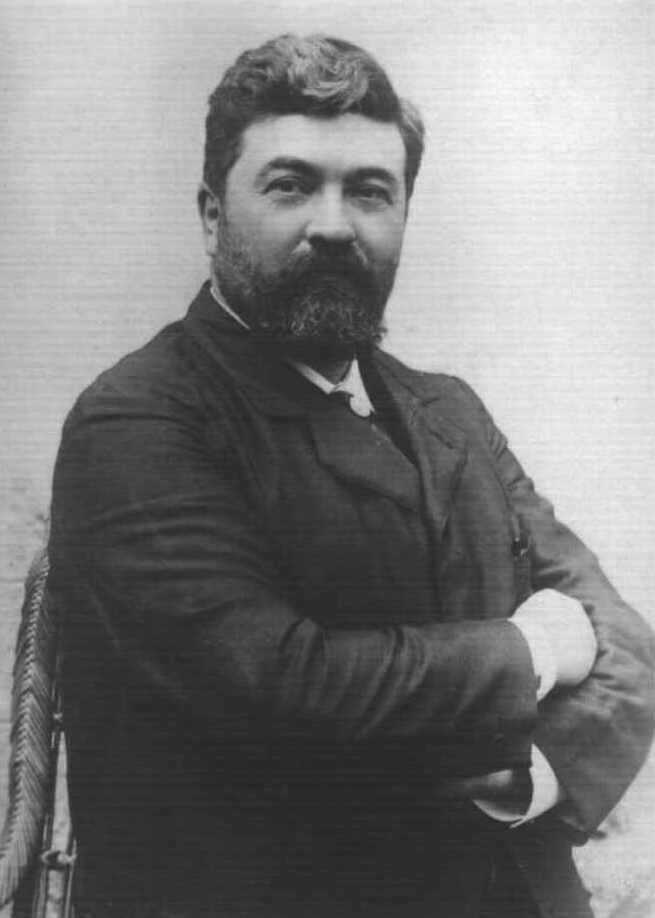
Ion Cantacuzino

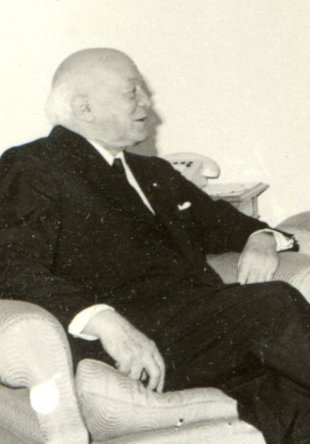
Henri Coandă

- Ion Cantacuzino: his discoveries were relevant in the treatment of cholera, epidemic typhus, tuberculosis, and scarlet fever.
- Elie Carafoli: a pioneering contributor to the field of aerodynamics.
- Alexandru Ciurcu: invented alongside Just Buisson the reaction engine.
- Henri Coandă: aircraft designer, discovered the Coandă effect of fluidics.
- George Constantinescu: founded the Theory of Sonics, based on which he developed a number of applications including a synchronization gear. He is also known as the inventor of a mechanical torque converter, he applied to an experimental automobile as automatic transmission.
- Justin Capră: engineer and inventor; machines on which he worked included a jetpack, 72 fuel-efficient cars, 15 unconventional engines and seven aircraft, among others.

== D ==
- Carol Davila: invented the Davila tincture used for the treatment of cholera, an opioid-based oral solution in use for symptomatic management of diarrhea.
- Anastase Dragomir: he invented the parachuted cell, a dischargeable chair from an aircraft or other vehicle, designed for emergency escapes, an early version of the modern ejection seat.

== E ==
- Lazăr Edeleanu: he was the first chemist to synthesize amphetamine.

== F ==
- Alexandru Froda: discovered Froda's theorem.

== G ==
- Mihai Gavrilă: theoretical quantum physicist, discoverer of atomic dichotomy in ultra-intense, high frequency laser fields.
- Tudor Ganea: discovered the Eilenberg−Ganea conjecture.
- Billy Gladstone: among his inventions is the "Ludwig Gladstone Cymbal”, a rare jazz instrument.
- Rodrig Goliescu: he built the avioplan, the first fixed-wing aircraft with a tubular fuselage and the "Aviocoleopter", the first vertical take-off and landing aircraft.
- Corneliu E. Giurgea: coined the term nootropics, after discovering Piracetam and describing it as such.

== H ==
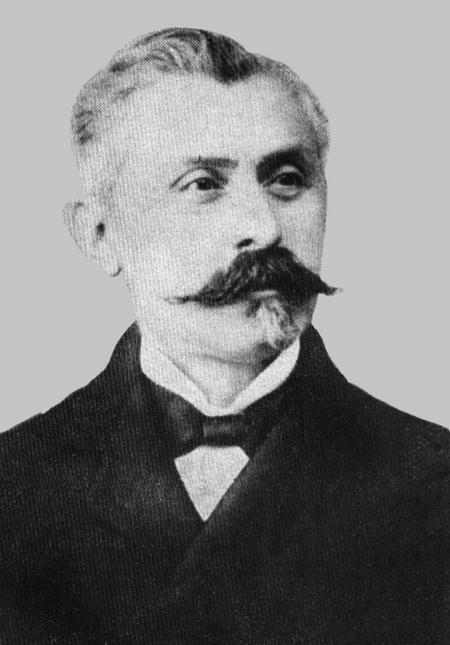
Spiru Haret

- Spiru Haret: he made a fundamental contribution to the n-body problem in celestial mechanics by proving that using a third degree approximation for the disturbing forces implies instability of the major axes of the orbits, and by introducing the concept of secular perturbations in relation to this.
- Horia Hulubei: he is the first physicist to obtain X-ray spectra in gases. He has important contributions in neutron physics and in the study of nuclear reactions.

== I ==
- Theodor V. Ionescu: the inventor of a multiple-cavity magnetron in 1935, a hydrogen maser in 1947, 3D imaging for cinema/television in 1924 and hot deuterium plasma studies for controlled nuclear fusion in 1969, member of the Romanian Academy since 1955.

== L ==
- Traian Lalescu: discovered the Lalescu sequence.
- Constantin Levaditi: alongside Karl Landsteiner, he discovered in 1909 the presence of the polio virus in tissues other than nervous.

== M ==
- Preda Mihăilescu: known for his proof of Catalan's conjecture.
- Meinhard E. Mayer: an early contributor to the theory of vector-bosons (W and Z bosons) and electro-weak unification, which later became the Standard Model, and an early advocate of the use of fiber bundles in gauge theory.
- Mina Minovici: famous for his extensive research regarding cadaverous alkaloids, putrefaction, simulated mind diseases, and criminal anthropology.
- Grigore Moisil: discovered Łukasiewicz-Moisil algebras, and he was elected a Member of the Romanian Academy
- Florentina I. Mosora: Romanian biophysicist who worked at first in the "Carol Davila" School of Medicine of the University of Bucharest, and subsequently in Belgium at the University of Liege; specialized in Nuclear Medicine, she applied nuclear medicine techniques and invented new methodology for the clinical investigation of type 2 diabetes.

== N ==
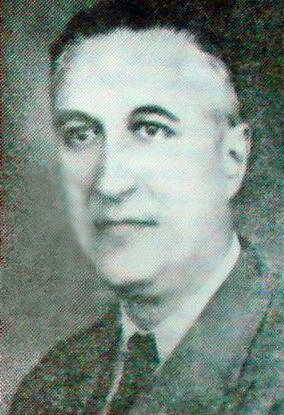
Costin D. Nenițescu

- Mihai Nadin: he founded the world's first program in Computational Design.
- Costin D. Nenițescu: he found new methods for the synthesis of pirilium salts, of carbenes, tryptamine, serotonin, two new syntheses for the indole nucleus, and a new method of polymerisation of ethylene.

== O ==
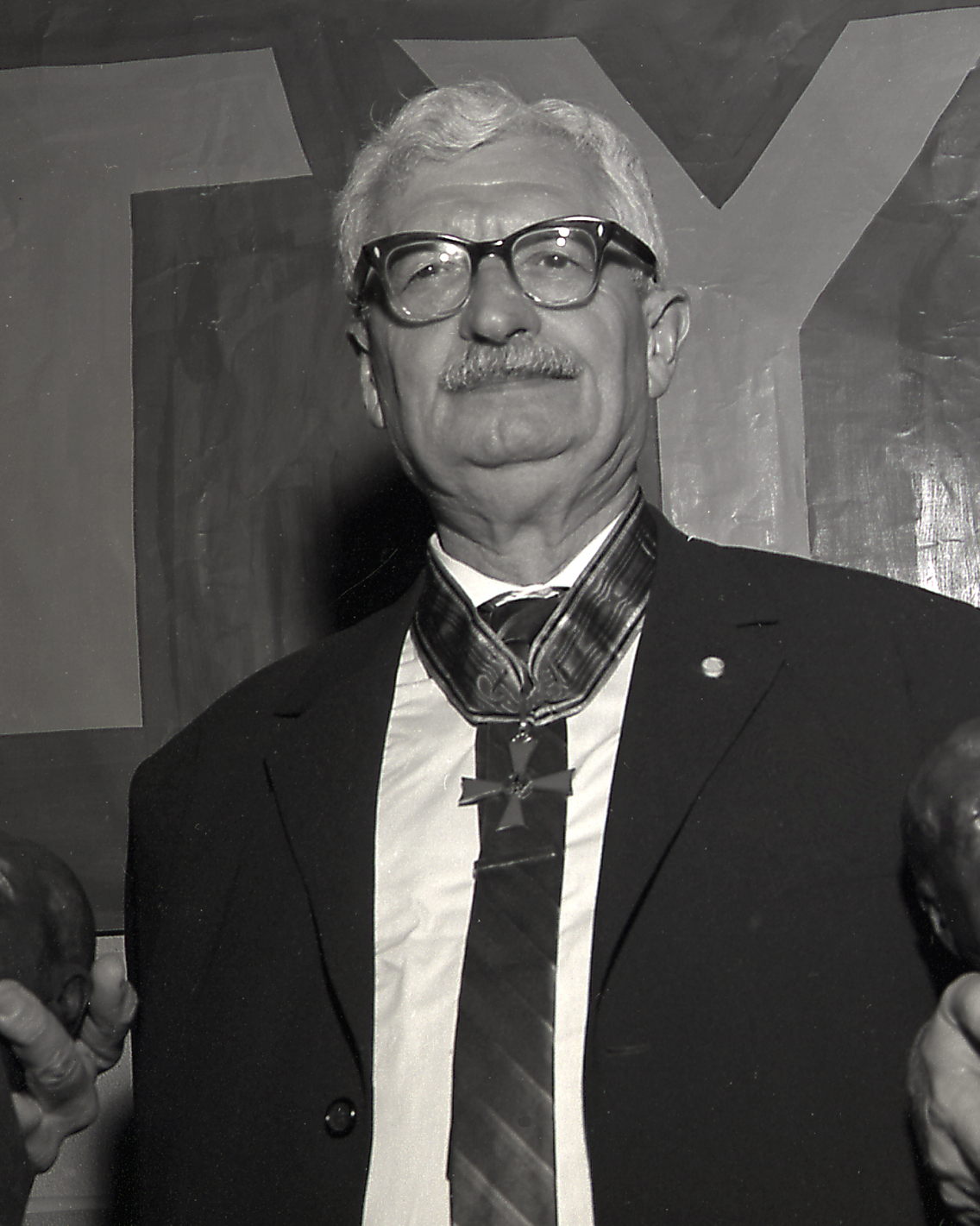
Hermann Oberth

- Hermann Oberth: along with the Russian Konstantin Tsiolkovsky and the American Robert Goddard, one of the founding fathers of rocketry and astronautics.
- Ștefan Odobleja: had supposedly established many of the major themes of cybernetics regarding cybernetics and systems thinking ten years before the work of Norbert Wiener was published in 1948.

== P ==
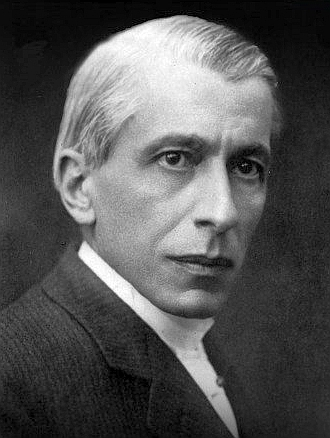
Nicolae Paulescu

- George Emil Palade: discoverer of the ribosomes.
- Nicolae Paulescu: physiologist, research on endocrine pancreas secretion.
- Gheorghe Paun: prominent for work on membrane computing and the P system.
- Eugen Pavel: inventor of the Hyper CD-ROM, a 3D optical data storage medium with a claimed initial capacity of 10 TB and with a theoretical capacity of 1 PB on a single disc.
- Aurel Perșu: built the first car to have wheels inside its aerodynamic line.
- Ion N. Petrovici: he described the Alternating Asphygmo-Pyramidal Syndrome in occlusions of the carotid arteries.
- Petrache Poenaru: invented the world's first fountain pen.
- Ioan Pușcaș: professor proposed the use of carbonic anhydrase (CA) inhibitor acetazolamide to heal peptic ulcers. In 1972 patented the first 100% efficient drug against gastroduodenal ulcer Ulcosilvanil.
- Dimitrie Pompeiu: His contributions were mainly in the field of mathematical analysis, complex functions theory, and rational mechanics. In an article published in 1929, he posed a challenging conjecture in integral geometry, now widely known as the Pompeiu problem.
- Nicolae Popescu: known for his contributions to Algebra and the theory of abelian categories with applications to rings and modules.
- Vasile M. Popov: He is well known for having developed a method to analyze stability of nonlinear dynamical systems, now known as Popov criterion.
- Alexandru Proca: He formulated the first mesonic theory of nuclear forces, including the equations for the mesonic vector field that carry his name (Proca's equations), elected post-mortem as a Member of the Romanian Academy.
- Ștefan Procopiu: He established the magnetic moment and determined the physical constant of magnetic moment, named magneton. The magneton is now known as the Bohr-Procopiu magneton.

== R ==
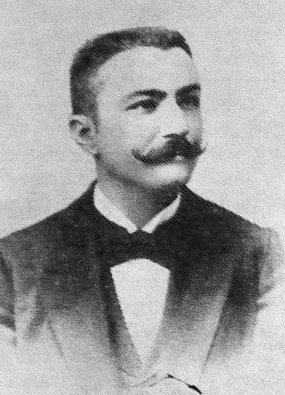
Emil Racoviță

- Emil Racoviță: the founder of biospeleology.
- Nicholas Georgescu-Roegen: introduced into economics, among other things, the concept of entropy from thermodynamics.

== S ==
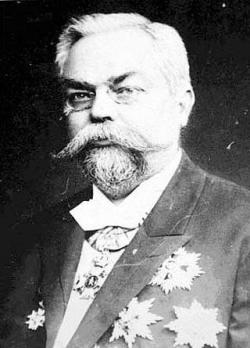
Anghel Saligny

- Anghel Saligny: built the first silos in the world made of reinforced concrete.
- Isaac Jacob Schoenberg: known for his discovery of splines.
- Robert Steinberg: invented the Steinberg representation, the Steinberg group in algebraic K-theory, and the Steinberg groups in Lie theory that yield finite simple groups over finite fields.
- Gabriel Sudan: known for the Sudan function, an important example in the theory of computation, similar to the Ackermann function.

== T ==
- Ion Tănăsescu: he discovered the Lehmstedt-Tanasescu reaction, which was improved by Karl Lehmstedt.
- Victor Toma: Romanian inventor of the first Romanian computer-CIFA-1, built with his team in 1955.
- Nicolae Teclu: invented the Teclu burner.
- Șerban Țițeica: founder of Romanian school of theoretical physics, with major contributions in thermodynamics, statistical physics, quantum mechanics and atomic physics.

== V ==
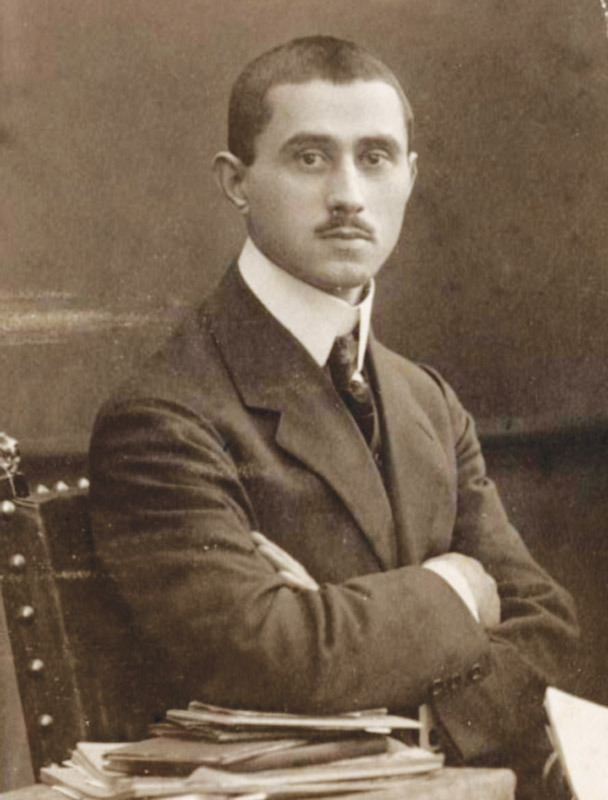
Aurel Vlaicu

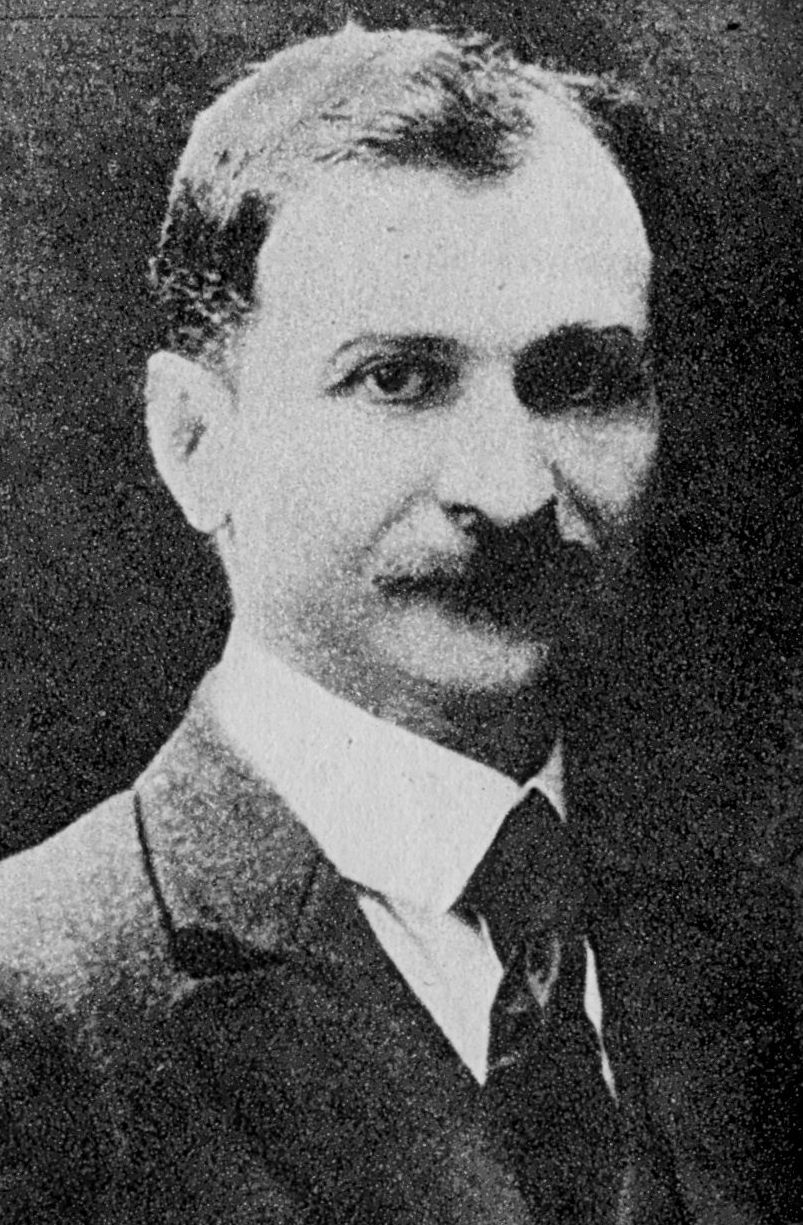
Traian Vuia

- Nicolae Vasilescu-Karpen: inventor of the Karpen Pile.
- Aurel Vlaicu: built the first arrow-shaped airplane.
- Valeria Văcărescu : mechanical engineer.
- Gheorghe Vrânceanu: discovered the notion of non-holonomic spaces.
- Traian Vuia: built the first fixed wing aircraft that could take off by its own power, in which he made a powered hop.

== W ==
- William F. Friedman: a cryptographer that invented the Index of Coincidence method (it broke Japan's PURPLE cipher for US forces).

== See also ==
- Science and technology in Romania
