= IAR-13 =

Romanian fighter/trainer aircraft prototype

IAR 13
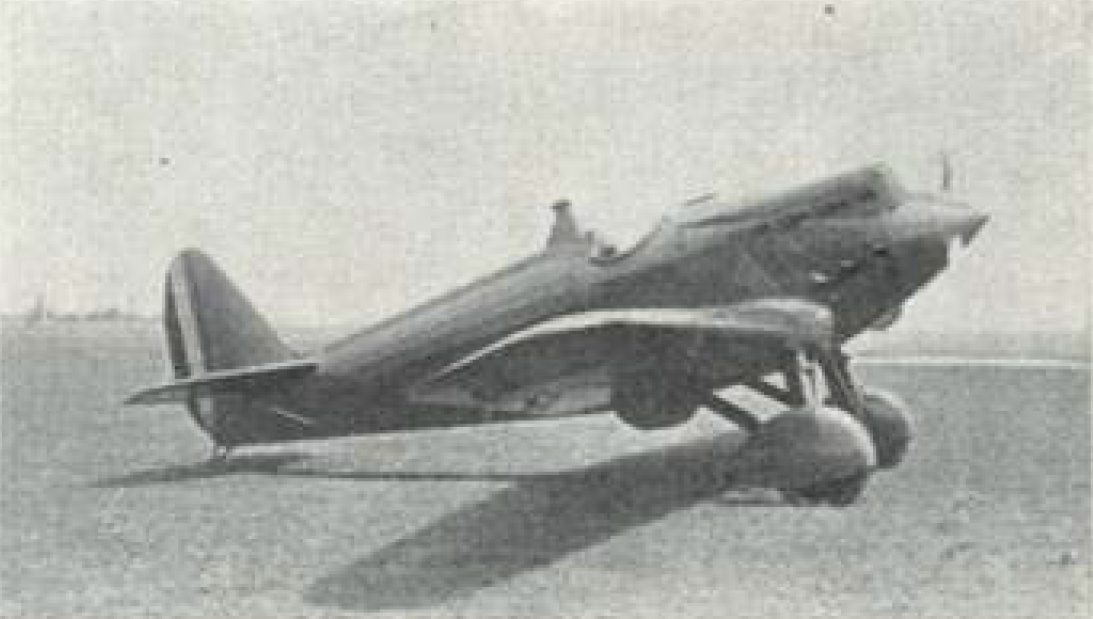

General information
- Type: Fighter-trainer aircraft
- Manufacturer: Industria Aeronautică Română (IAR)

History
- Manufactured: 1
- First flight: 1933
- Developed from: IAR 12

The IAR 13 is a Romanian low-wing monoplane fighter-trainer aircraft designed before World War II.

== Design and development ==
The powerplant for IAR 12, was an IAR LD 450 12-cylinder W-form watercooled in-line built under license Lorraine-Dietrich 12 Eb, that offered 450 h.p. (336 kW) at 1,900 r.p.m., similar to the type fitted to the first C.V. 11. However, due to the increased aerodynamic drag, the maximum speed at ground level decreased to 294 km/h. This unsatisfactory result, combined with poor handling characteristics experienced during early test flights, constrained Carafoli to improve the construction and try a new engine.

The new project, called I.A.R. 13, was essentially similar to the abandoned '12', except for the fin-and-rudder. Its surface had been reduced and instead of a rounded shape it became oval. The fuselage, wings and the anti-crash pylon had all been retained, while the undercarriage suffered minor changes. The engine fitted to the airframe was a Hispano-Suiza 12Mc of 500 h.p. (373 kW) output at 2,200 r.p.m. that operated a two-blade, all-metal Ratier propeller. The more powerful engine helped to boost the top speed to 330 km/h, which meant a significant 12% increase. The overall flying characteristics were improved as well. Nevertheless, these significant results and the demonstration flights performed by Locotenent aviator Eugen "Puiu" Pârvulescu in 1933 did not impress the senior ARR leaders, still resistant to the new idea of a low-wing monoplane fighter.

== Operators ==
Romania

- Royal Romanian Air Force

== Specifications (IAR 13) ==
Data from

General characteristics

- Crew: 1
- Length: 7.34 m (24 ft 1 in)
- Wingspan: 11.70 m (38 ft 5 in)
- Height: 3.5 m (12 ft 6 in)
- Wing area: 19.8 m^{2} (213.13 sq ft)
- Empty weight: 1,150 kg (2,535 lb)
- Gross weight: 1,530 kg (3,373 lb)
- Powerplant: 1 × Hispano-Suiza 12Mc of 500 h.p , 340 kW (450 hp)

Performance

- Maximum speed: 330 km/h (205 mph, 178 kn) at sea level
- Endurance: 2 hours 10 minutes
- Service ceiling: 7,900 m (25,915 ft)

Armament

- 2 x 7.7 mm Vickers machine-guns in the nose of the aircraft firing through airscrew.

== See also ==
Related development

- IAR 11
- IAR 14

Aircraft of comparable role, configuration, and era

- Boeing P-26
- Dewoitine D.500
- Avia BH-3

== Bibliography ==
- Cortet, Pierre (May 1976). "Les chasseurs I.A.R: à la mode "Jockey" des années 30, mais en Roumanie..." [The I.A.R Fighters: In the Jockey Style of the Thirties, but in Romania...]. Le Fana de l'Aviation (in French) (78): 10–13. ISSN 0757-4169.
