= List of spurious inventions =

This is a list of spurious inventions, technologies which are generally considered to not possess their claimed capabilities, to be hoaxes, or to not have ever existed in the first place.

| Spurious invention | Description |
|---|---|
| Angel Light | According to its inventor, this device could make walls, hands, and stealth shielding transparent. |
| "The Bell" | Purported top-secret scientific technological device, wonder weapon, or Wunderwaffe developed in the 1940s in Nazi Germany. |
| Black box | Popular name for a diagnostic machine made by Albert Abrams. It supposedly could diagnose diseases based on their special vibrations that can be sensed along someone's spine. |
| Chronovisor | A time viewer claimed to have produced photographs and recordings of the ancient past. |
| Cloudbuster | A device that could purportedly make rain through manipulating atmospheric orgone, a kind of energy considered to be pseudoscientific. |
| Edison | A device claimed to produce numerous analyses of blood very quickly using very small samples. |
| Etheric generator | A generator which John Ernst Worrell Keely claimed could produce a vapor "more powerful than steam, and considerably more economical", by some force affecting the added water, and air. |
| Gavreau's infrasonic weapons | Various whistles and horns, possibly fictional, which could cause serious bodily harm and death by emitting infrasound. |
| Mechanical Turk | An 18th-century chess-playing automaton that appeared to operate autonomously but actually concealed a human operator, deceiving audiences for decades. |
| Rife machine | Devices that can, purportedly, by the use of electromagnetic waves, destroy pathogens, including cancer. There is no reliable evidence that the Rife machine works as a cure for cancer. |
| Teleforce | A weapon, also known as Nikola Tesla's death ray or peace ray, that would accelerate pellets of material to a high velocity so as to cause significant damage from a long distance. |
| Nikola Tesla's electric car | Nikola Tesla allegedly remodeled a Pierce-Arrow luxury car into an electric vehicle that directly extracted vacuum energy from the "aether". |
| Fleischmann–Pons cold fusion experiment | Attempt to cause nuclear fusion using electrolysis to achieve the high compression ratio and mobility of deuterium. |
| Kryakutnoy | Fictional inventor of hot air balloons. |
| Newman energy machine | Supposed free-energy machine invented by Joe W. Newman. |
| Perpetual motion machines | Hypothetical machines that do not need any added energy or force to continue motion. All attempts as of yet are considered spurious, and such a machine is considered impossible by modern thermodynamics. |
| Hyper CD-ROM | Allegedly created by Romanian scientist Eugen Pavel in 1991, it is a claimed optical data storage device similar to the CD-ROM with a multilayer 3D structure of 2,000 different layers and can allegedly hold up to 1 PB and theoretically up to 100 EB, despite being claimed to have been invented in 1991 and multiple awards were given to Eugen Pavel, it has not shown a working prototype. |
| Sloot Digital Coding System | Allegedly created by Jan Sloot in 1995, it is an alleged technique for data encoding that could represent an entire feature film with only one kilobyte of data, a level of compression which is mathematically impossible according to Shannon's source coding theorem. Contrary to his claims, the playback device he used was discovered to contain a hard drive. |
| Sonora Aero Club's Aeros | Prussian-American artist Charles Dellschau created drawings of fantastic flying machines that he claimed have been invented by members of the "Sonora Aero Club," of which he was a purported member. Dellschau alleged that one of the club members discovered a formula for an anti-gravity fuel called "NB Gas", which has been used to fuel the vehicles. |

== See also ==
- List of hoaxes
- List of lost inventions
