= IMCS =

IMCS can refer to any of the following:

- Pax Romana, also known as the International Movement of Catholic Students (IMCS).
- The Institute for Media Management and Communication Studies, a reputed media institute in New Delhi is a study centre of the Makhanlal Chaturvedi National University of Journalism
- The Institute of Marine and Coastal Sciences, an oceanographic institute located at Rutgers University in New Jersey
- International Mornington Crescent Society, the rulemaking body of Mornington Crescent, a game
- The International Membrane Computing Society, the organization whose objective is to promote the development of membrane computing.
