= IAR-12 =

Romanian fighter prototype

IAR 12
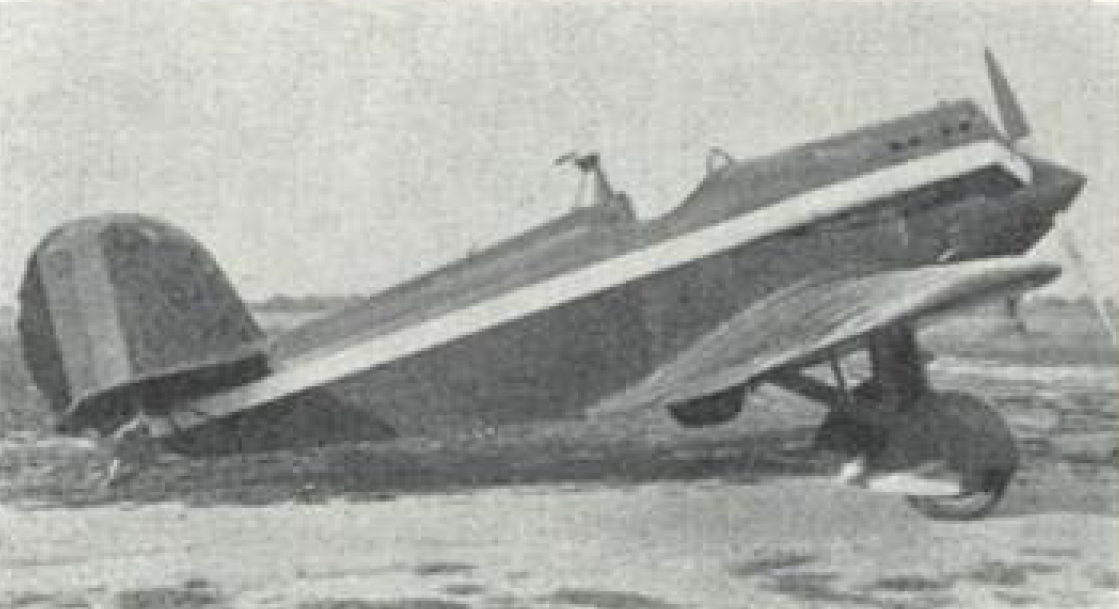

General information
- Type: Fighter-trainer aircraft
- Manufacturer: Industria Aeronautică Română (IAR)

History
- Manufactured: 1
- First flight: 1933
- Developed from: IAR 11

The IAR 12 is a Romanian low-wing monoplane fighter-trainer aircraft designed before World War II.

== Design and development ==
The failure of the first fighter designed at Brașov did not discourage the energetic team of the I.A.R. Works. Even before the second prototype of the C.V. 11 was disqualified from the fighter contest, the first details of its successor had already been laid out by Engineer-in-Chief Elie Carafoli. A new tail with enlarged rudder was fitted to essentially the same fuselage, giving a more conventional look and offering better control during flight. As a consequence, the overall height increased by more than a meter, i.e., 40% of the original dimension. Unlike the IAR 11 design, the wingtips were rounded, and the span had been increased as well, giving a 19.80 m^{2} (213.1 sq ft) wing area compared to the original 18.20 m^{2} (195.9 sq ft) of the C.V. 11. An anti-crash pylon with a minuscule Venturi-tube installed at its top appeared behind the cockpit to protect the pilot in case the aircraft overturned.

The powerplant chosen for the new aircraft, named I.A.R. 12, was again a Lorraine-Dietrich 12Eb, that offered 450 h.p. (336 kW) at 1,900 r.p.m., similar to the type fitted to the first C.V. 11. However, due to the increased aerodynamic drag, the maximum speed at ground level decreased to 294 km/h (183 mph). This unsatisfactory result, combined with poor handling characteristics experienced during early test flights, constrained Carafoli to improve the construction and try a new engine, fitted to essentially the same fuselage, giving a more conventional look and offering better control during flight. An anti-crash pylon with a minuscule Venturi-tube installed at its top appeared behind the cockpit to protect the pilot in case the aircraft overturned. Such a feature on the C.V. 11 C1 could have saved the life of Cpt. Popescu on that fatal day in early December 1931.

== Operators ==
Romania

- Royal Romanian Air Force

== Specifications (IAR 12) ==
Data from

General characteristics

- Crew: one
- Length: 7.2 m (24 ft 7 in)
- Wingspan: 11.70 m (38 ft 5 in)
- Height: 3.5 m (12 ft 6 in)
- Wing area: 19.8 m^{2} (213.13 sq ft)
- Empty weight: 1,150 kg (2,535 lb)
- Gross weight: 1,540 kg (3,395 lb)
- Powerplant: 1 × IAR LD 450 12-cylinder W-form watercooled in-line built under license Lorraine-Dietrich 12 Eb , 340 kW (450 hp)

Performance

- Maximum speed: 294 km/h (183 mph, 159 kn) at sea level
- Endurance: 2 hours 10 minutes
- Service ceiling: 7,900 m (25,915 ft)

Armament

- 2 x 7.7 mm Vickers machine-guns in the nose of the aircraft firing through airscrew.

== See also ==
Related development

- IAR 11
- IAR 14

Aircraft of comparable role, configuration, and era

- Boeing P-26
- Dewoitine D.500
- Avia BH-3

== Bibliography ==
- Cortet, Pierre (May 1976). "Les chasseurs I.A.R: à la mode "Jockey" des années 30, mais en Roumanie..." [The I.A.R Fighters: In the Jockey Style of the Thirties, but in Romania...]. Le Fana de l'Aviation (in French) (78): 10–13. ISSN 0757-4169.
