= CV11 =

CV11 or variation, may refer to:

- USS Intrepid (CV-11), a former United States Navy aircraft carrier
- CV11, a postal district in the CV postcode area, United Kingdom
- CV11, a diesel version of the Toyota Camry automobile
- IAR CV 11, an airplane

== See also ==
- CV (disambiguation)
