= Modelling of General Systems =

MGS (a General Model of Simulation) is a domain-specific language used for specification and simulation of dynamical systems with dynamical structure, developed at IBISC (Computer Science, Integrative Biology and Complex Systems) at Université d'Évry Val-d'Essonne (University of Évry). MGS is particularly aimed at modelling biological systems.

The MGS computational model is a generalisation of cellular automata, Lindenmayer systems, Paun systems and other computational formalisms inspired by chemistry and biology. It manipulates collections - sets of positions, filled with some values, in a lattice with a user-defined topology.
