= Victor Babeș University of Medicine and Pharmacy of Timișoara =

Public university in Timișoara, Romania

- Universitatea de Medicină și Farmacie „Victor Babeș” din Timișoara
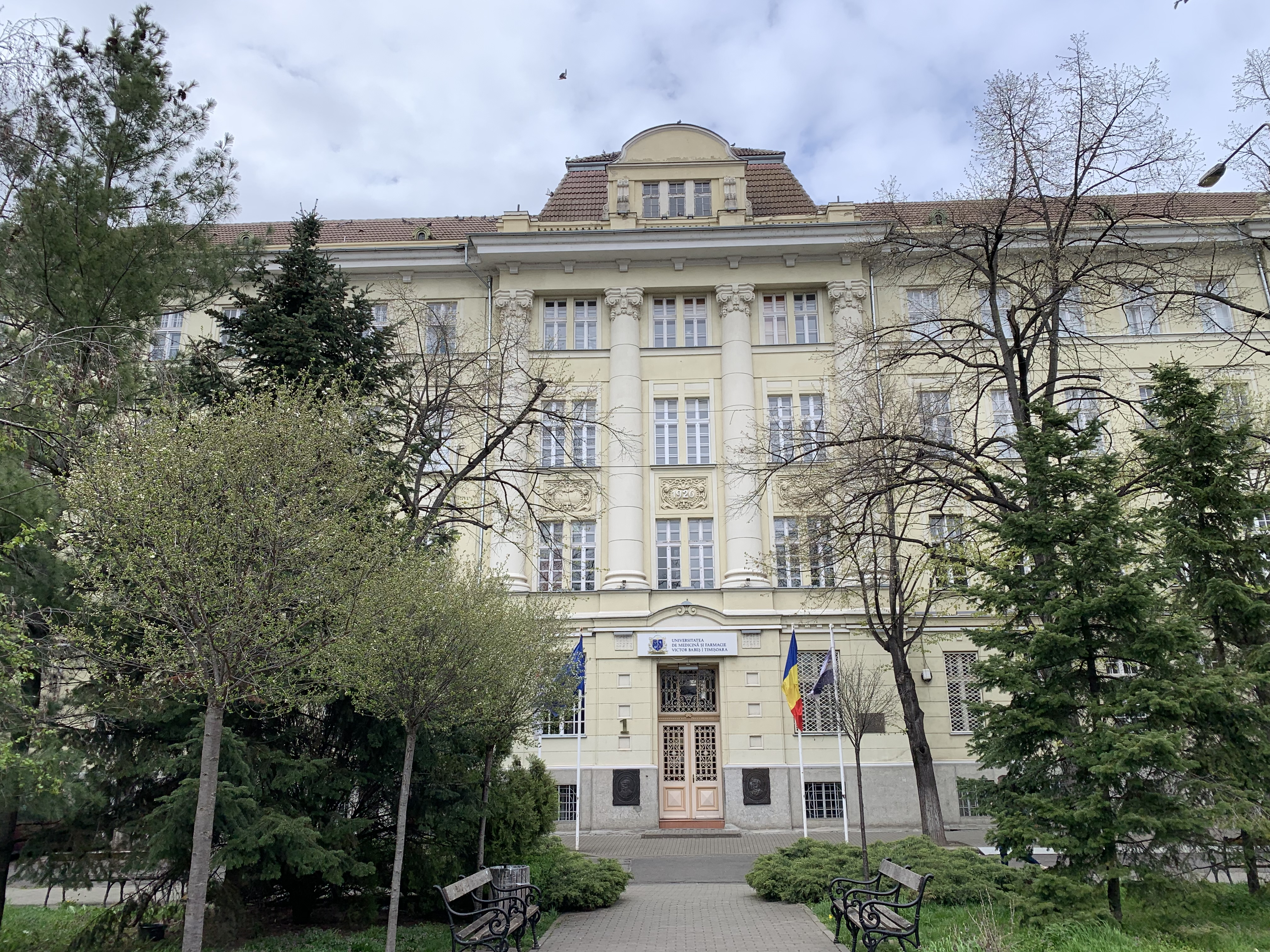
- Former names: Institute of Medicine (1948–1990)
- Motto: Doctrina et scientia in posterum
- Motto in English: "Education and science for the future"
- Type: Public
- Established: 30 December 1944; 81 years ago
- Budget: RON 189,735,971 (2019/2020)
- Rector: Octavian Crețu
- Total staff: 1,192 (2019/2020)
- Students: 6,813 (2019/2020)
- Location: Timișoara, Timiș, Romania; 45°45′25″N 21°14′12″E
- Campus: Multiple sites
- Colors: Blue and golden
- Website: www.umft.ro

Victor Babeș University of Medicine and Pharmacy of Timișoara (Romanian: Universitatea de Medicină și Farmacie „Victor Babeș” din Timișoara; abbreviated UMFT) is a state university in Timișoara. The university was founded on 30 December 1944 by decree of the then King of Romania Michael I. There are three faculties within UMFT: Medicine, Dentistry and Pharmacy. In 2011, UMFT was classified as an education and research university by the Ministry of Education. The university is named after Victor Babeș (1854–1926), the author of the first bacteriology treatise in the world and the founder of the Romanian school of microbiology.

== History ==
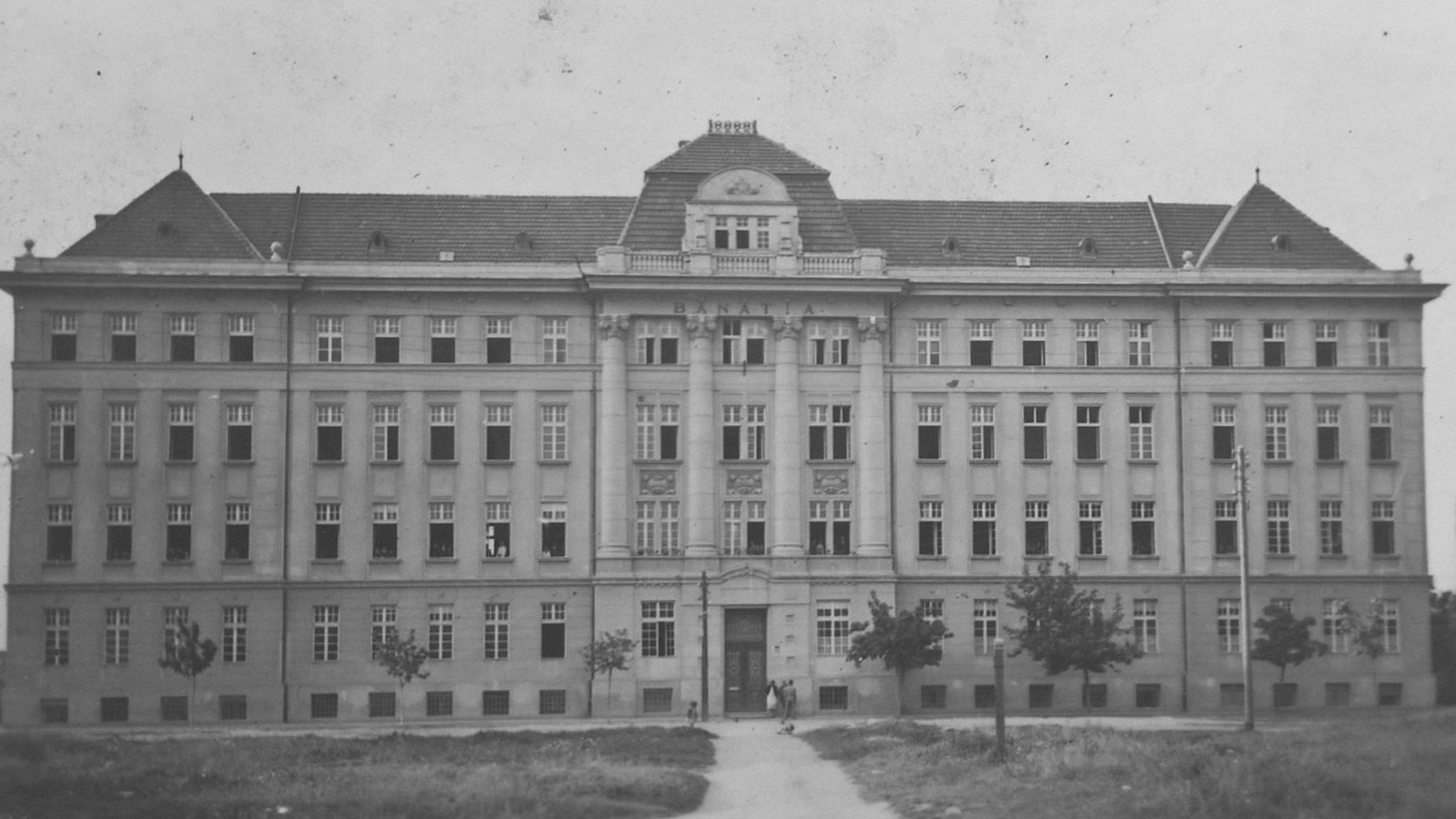
Banatia High School in 1939. Today, the building houses the Rectorate of UMFT.

The school was founded as a faculty on 30 December 1944, when King Michael I signed Decree-Law no. 660:

Art. 1 – The West University is founded on the date of publication of this hereby law, having the following faculties: Law, Literature and Philosophy, Sciences, Human Medicine, Veterinary Medicine, Pharmacology and Theology.

The inauguration of the new university took place on 15 July 1945 and classes started three days later in the Notre Dame High School (present-day Students' House). There were 412 students enrolled in the first year and 76 students in the second year, transferred from other universities. The first class graduated in 1949, counting 70 graduate students. In October 1945, the faculty was given the current premises – the former German-language Banatia High School built in 1926, requisitioned and transformed into a Soviet military hospital during World War II.

Following the education reform, by Decree no. 175/1948 published in the Official Gazette no. 177/1948, the Faculty of Medicine became the Institute of Medicine, having in its composition three faculties: General Medicine, Pediatrics and Hygiene. In 1964, the department with a dental profile became the Faculty of Dentistry. Professor Emanoil Popa, then head of works, professor Nicolae Duțescu (from Iași) and head of works Radu Roșiu (from Cluj) contributed significantly to its establishment. The Faculty of Pharmacy was founded in 1990, the year in which the Institute of Medicine changed its name to the University of Medicine. It received its current name by Government Decision no. 23/2001.

== Faculties ==
Faculty	Location	Dean	Specializations		Students (2020/2021)
Faculty	Location	Dean	Undergraduate	Postgraduate	Students (2020/2021)
Medicine	2 Eftimie Murgu Square	Bogdan Timar	8: Medicine (Romanian); Medicine (English); Medicine (French); General medical care – Timișoara; General medical care – Lugoj; General medical care – Deva; Nutrition and dietetics; Balneophysiokinetotherapy	6: Management of social and health services; Prevention and recovery in cardiopulmonary diseases; Clinical and community nutrition; Modern applications of laboratory medicine in personalization of medical act; Health education management; Legal responsibility of medical staff	5,103
Dentistry	9 1989 Revolution Boulevard	Meda Negruțiu	3: Dentistry (Romanian); Dentistry (English); Dental technique		1,039
Pharmacy	Henri Coandă Street	Codruța Șoica	3: Pharmacy; Pharmacy assistance – Lugoj; Medical cosmetics and cosmetic product technology	2: OTC drugs, food supplements, cosmetics; Formulation and evaluation of dermato-cosmetic product	671

== Infrastructure ==
=== Dormitories ===
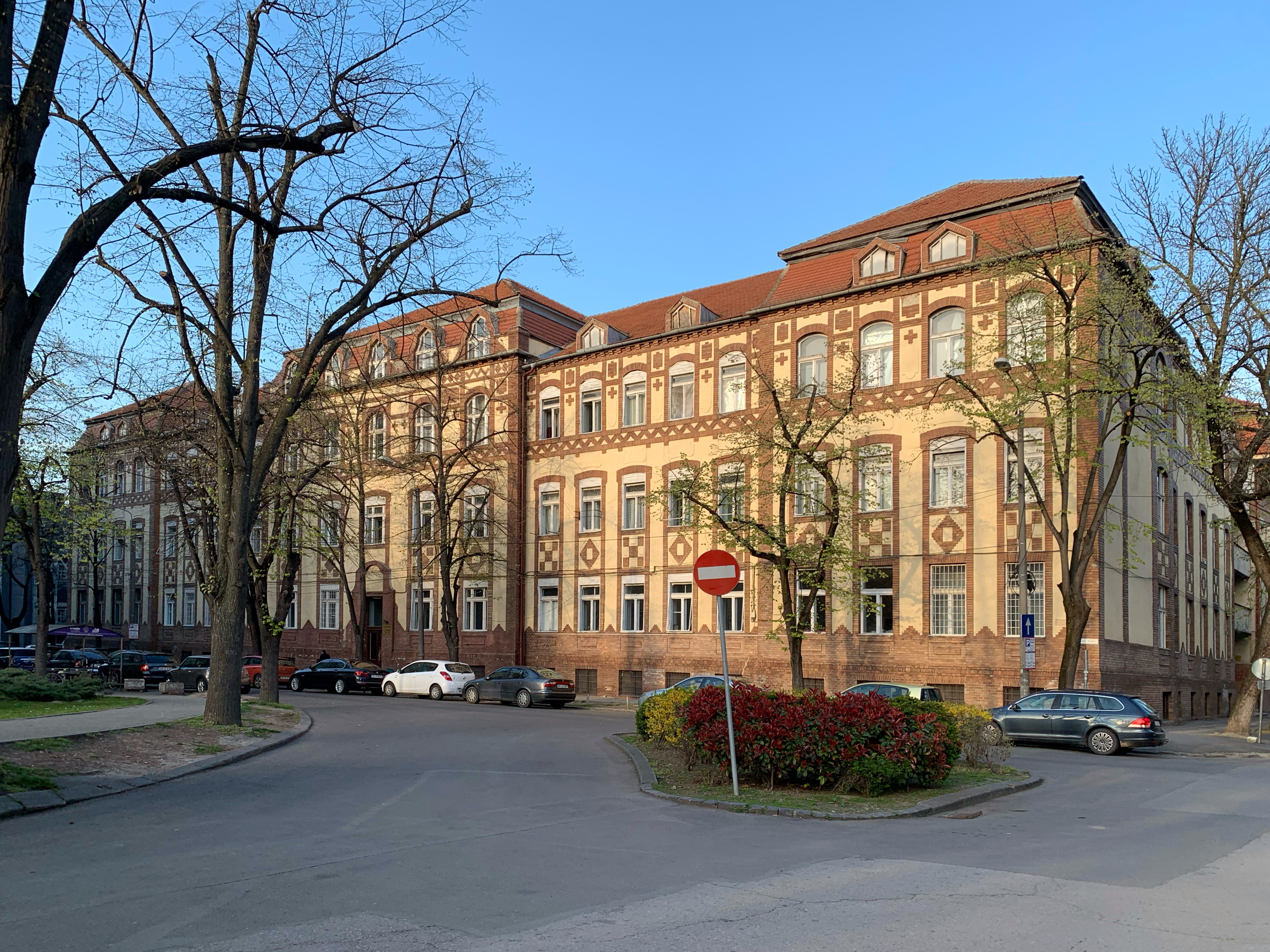
Dormitory 1–2

As of 2017, UMFT has about 2,500 student accommodation places in seven dormitories.

=== Canteen ===
In the beginning, meals were served at the Territorial Military Center and then at the canteen of the Polytechnic Institute until October 1945, when the university founded its own canteen, which today is able to provide meals for 900 people per day. In 2012, UMFT opened the first diet canteen for students with diabetes, congenital heart defects and other diseases.

=== Library ===
The library of the Timișoara Institute of Medicine was founded in March 1946 with a number of 40 volumes, the book deposit being common with the reading room, whose capacity was 50 seats. Already from 1948–1949, the first acquisitions of books and magazines began, from bookstores and private individuals. Along the way, with the necessary financial resources, subscriptions were made to specialized magazines in the country and abroad. Currently, the library's holdings exceed 182,000 volumes of books and 31,000 volumes of magazines. The library has 45 branches in clinics and laboratories.
