= Aurel Babeș =

Romanian physician (1886–1961)

- Born: December 11, 1886; Bucharest, Kingdom of Romania
- Died: December 31, 1961 (aged 75); Bucharest, Romanian People's Republic
- Resting place: Bellu Cemetery, Bucharest
- Education: Carol Davila University of Medicine and Pharmacy
- Known for: Vaginal smear as screening test for cervical cancer
- Spouse: Lucia Șerbănescu
- Scientific career
- Fields: Medicine
- Workplaces: Carol Davila University of Medicine and Pharmacy
- Thesis: Cerebrospinal fluid: Clinical and experimental study (1915)

Aurel A. Babeș (11 December 1886 – 7 August 1962) was a Romanian scientist and one of the discoverers of the vaginal smear as screening test for cervical cancer.

== Biography ==
Aurel Babeș was born in 1886, in Bucharest. His father, Aurel V. Babeș (1852–1925), was the son of Vincențiu Babeș; he studied under Robert Bunsen at Heidelberg University and was a chemistry professor at the Faculty of Veterinary Science of the University of Bucharest. His paternal uncle was Victor Babeș, co-author (with Victor André Cornil) of the first treaty of bacteriology.

After attending Gheorghe Lazăr High School, Babeș enrolled in 1905 at the Carol Davila University of Medicine and Pharmacy, graduating in 1911. He received his Doctorate magna cum laude in 1915 with thesis Cerebrospinal fluid. Clinical and experimental study, which was awarded the Hillel Award of the Faculty of Medicine and the Lazăr Award of the Romanian Academy of Sciences. After specializing in pathology, he was appointed in 1921 assistant lecturer in the gynecological clinic at Colțea Hospital headed by Constantin Daniel (1876–1973). Daniel and Babeș conducted the first studies that demonstrated that cervical cancer could be diagnosed via smears, which led some to refer to Colțea Hospital as the "birthplace of cervical smear".

In 1929 Babeș became assistant professor at the University of Medicine and Pharmacy, a position he held until 1941. Subsequently, he worked at the Center for Diagnosis and Care of Cancer until 1948, and then as a pathologist and researcher at the Institute of Endocrinology.

Babeș married fellow gynecologist Lucia Șerbănescu in 1930. They adopted a daughter, who settled in Galați and became an acclaimed opera singer. Babeș was 75 years old when he died in Bucharest in 1961. He is buried at Bellu Cemetery.

== Scientific discoveries ==
Babeș and Georgios Papanikolaou discovered independently and almost simultaneously the cervical test now known as the Pap test. Although Papanikolaou is generally credited for the invention of the cervical cancer screening test by cervical cytology, Michael O'Dowd and Elliot Philipp believe that Babeș was the true pioneer in the cytologic diagnosis of cervical cancer. He discovered that if a platinum loop was used to collect cells from a cervix, and the cells were then dried on a slide and stained, it could be determined if cancer cells were present. This was the first screening test to diagnose cervical and uterine cancer. Babeș presented his findings to the Romanian Society of Gynaecology in Bucharest on 23 January 1927. His method of cancer diagnosis was published in a French medical journal, La Presse Médicale, on 11 April 1928, but it is unlikely that Papanikolaou was aware of it. Moreover, the two techniques are different in their design according to Diamantis et al. Even though Babeș preceded Papanikolaou, the design of the Pap test belongs to Papanikolaou. This breakthrough in cervical cancer diagnosis has saved the lives of over 6 million women.

It is said that Babeș was very aware of the great international reputation that Papanikolaou had gained in contrast to his own. In a spirit of recognition and fairness, Romania refers to cervical testing as "Méthode Babeș–Papanicolaou" in honor of Babeș.

== Publications ==
- Babeș, Aurel; Bușilă, V. (1915). Cercetări originale despre pelagra în România. București: Librăriile Socec & Comp., C. Sfetea. OCLC 22244848.
- Babeș, Aurel A. (1924). "Zur Ätiologie der uterinen Schleimhauthyperplasie". Archiv für Gynäkologie (in German). 122 (1–2): 448–468. doi:10.1007/BF01944312. S2CID 29244512.
- Babeș, Aurel (1927). "Uterusschleimhauthyperplasie und Ovarialgeschwülste". Archiv für Gynäkologie (in German). 131 (1): 45–49. doi:10.1007/BF01745019. S2CID 41882734.
- Babeș, Aurel (1927). "Cellules pigmentaires rameuses dans un polype de la muqueuse uterine". Annales d'anatomie pathologique (in French). 4: 373–378.
- Babeș, Aurel (1929). "On the histopathology of a recurring lipoma of the proliferating glandular type". Bulletin de l'Association Française pour l'Étude du Cancer. 18: 334.
- Babeș, Aurel (1930). "Thymus et cancer du goudron". Comptes rendus des séances de la Société de biologie et de ses filiales (in French). 103: 165–167.
- Babeș, Aurel (1930). "Thymus et thyroïde". Comptes rendus des séances de la Société de biologie et de ses filiales (in French). 103: 168–169.
