= Victor Babeș =

Romanian physician and professor

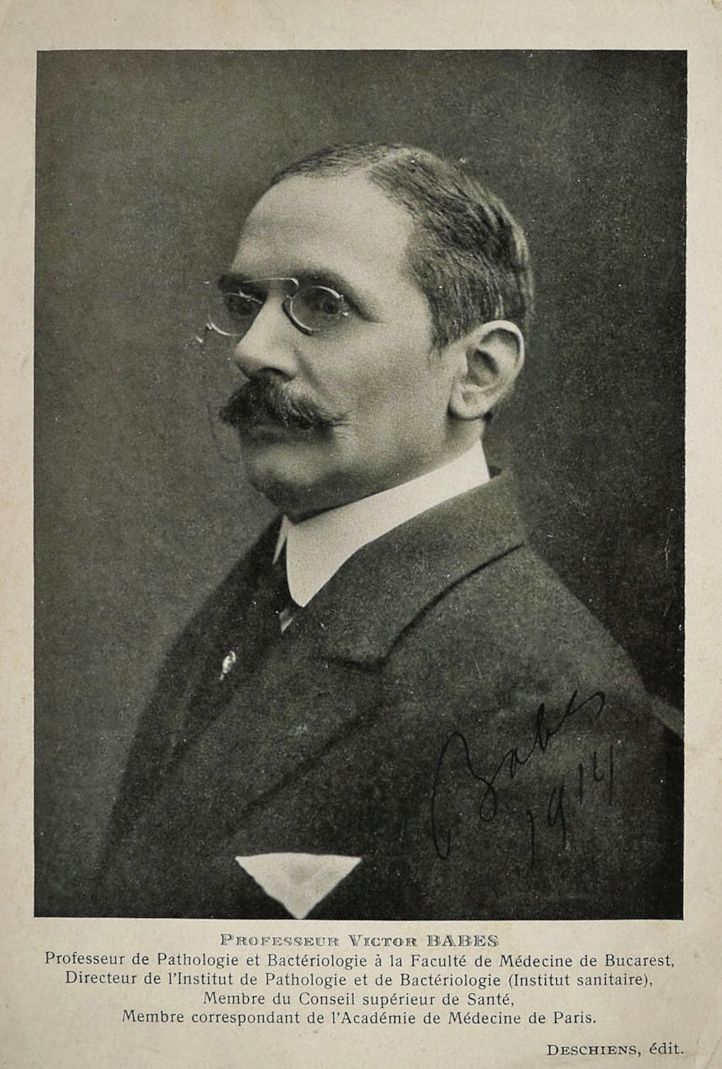
- Born: 28 July 1854; Vienna, Austrian Empire
- Died: 19 October 1926 (aged 72); Bucharest, Kingdom of Romania
- Resting place: Cantacuzino Institute, Bucharest
- Education: Semmelweis University; University of Vienna
- Known for: One of the founders of modern microbiology Important contributions to the study of rabies, leprosy, diphtheria, tuberculosis
- Spouse: Iosefina Thorma
- Children: Mircea
- Scientific career
- Workplaces: Semmelweis University; University of Vienna; Carol Davila University of Medicine and Pharmacy

Notes
- Vincențiu Babeș (father); Sophia Goldschneider (mother)

Victor Babeș (Romanian pronunciation: [ˈviktor ˈbabeʃ]; 28 July 1854 in Vienna – 19 October 1926 in Bucharest) was a Romanian physician, bacteriologist, academician and professor. One of the founders of modern microbiology, Victor Babeș is the author of one of the first treatises of bacteriology in the world – Bacteria and their role in pathological anatomy and histology of infectious diseases, written in collaboration with French scientist Victor André Cornil in 1885. In 1888, Babeș underlined the principle of passive immunity, and a few years later he enunciated the principle of antibiosis. He made early and significant contributions to the study of rabies, leprosy, diphtheria, tuberculosis and other infectious diseases. He also discovered more than 50 unknown germs and foresaw new methods of staining bacteria and fungi. Victor Babeș introduced rabies vaccination and founded serotherapy in Romania.

Babeș-Bolyai University in Cluj-Napoca and the University of Medicine and Pharmacy in Timișoara bear his name.

== Origin and family ==
Victor Babeș was the son of Vincențiu Babeș and Sophia Goldschneider. His father was a Romanian magistrate, teacher, journalist and politician from the Banat region, founding member of the Romanian Academic Society (22 April 1866) and President of the History Section of the Romanian Academy (1898–1899). One of the personalities who have distinguished themselves in the fight for the rights of Romanians in Transylvania, Vincențiu Babeș was repeatedly deputy in the Vienna Award and president of the Romanian National Party. Victor had a sister, Alma, and a brother, Aurel. The younger brother of Victor Babeș, Aurel, was a chemist and worked with Victor at the Institute of Bucharest. The son of Aurel, Aurel A. Babeș, was also a physician, and discovered a screening test for cervical cancer.

Victor Babeș was married to Iosefina Thorma, with whom he had a son, Mircea.

== Studies ==
In childhood, Victor Babeș was always attracted to poetry, music and especially literature, alongside performance sports, natural science and dramatics. He began studying dramatic arts in Budapest. The death of his sister, Alma, caused by tuberculosis, at a young age, led him to abandon his started studies and enroll in medicine. He attended the Faculty of Medicine in Budapest and Vienna. Victor received his doctorate in medicine in Vienna, in 1878. In 1881 he received a scholarship and went to Paris and Berlin, where he worked with leading teachers of the time: Cornil, Louis Pasteur, Rudolf Virchow, Robert Koch and others. He continued to study with great teachers from Munich, Heidelberg, and Strasbourg until 1886.

== Scientific activity ==
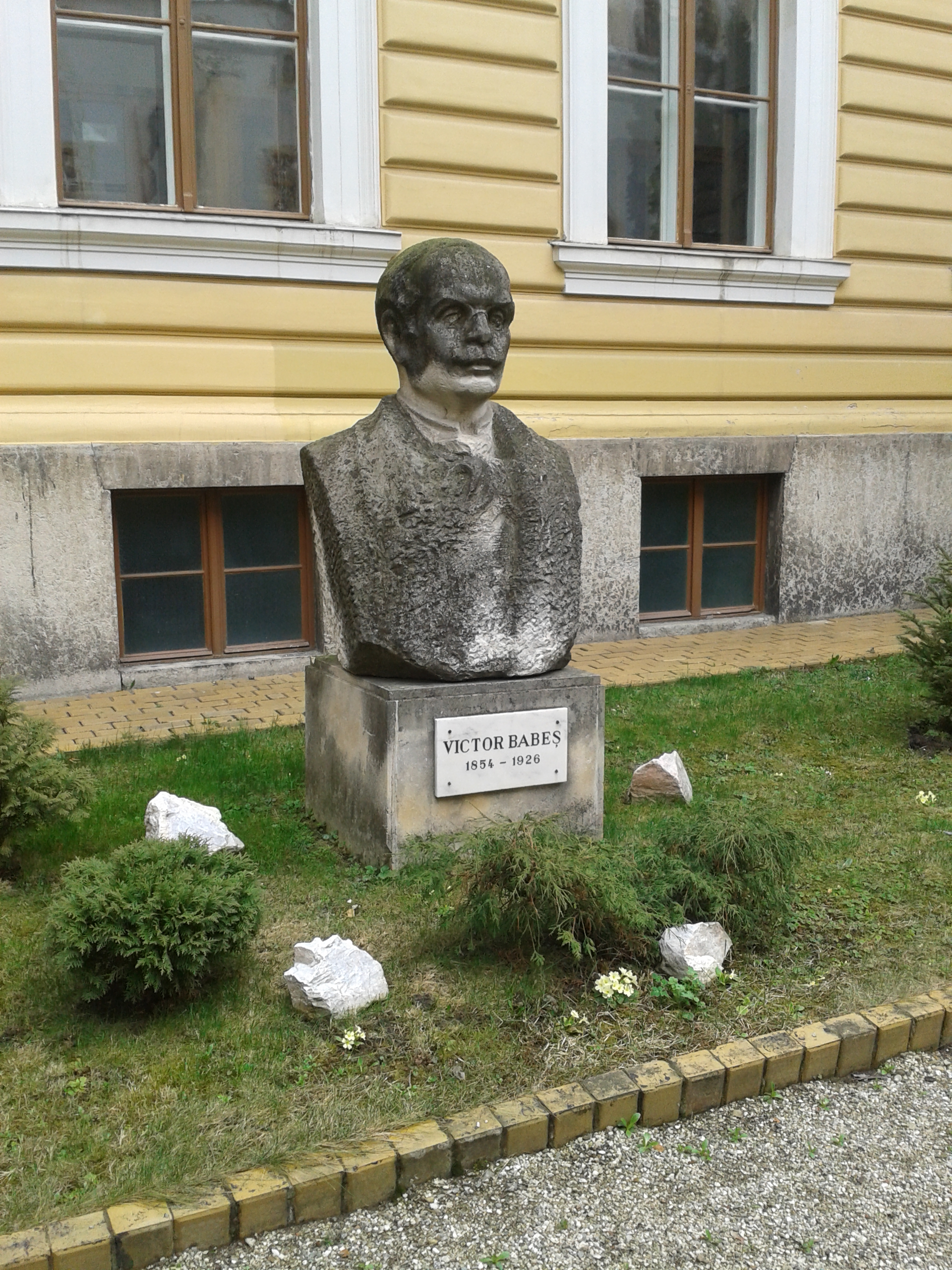
Bust of Victor Babeș in front of Babeș-Bolyai University in Cluj-Napoca

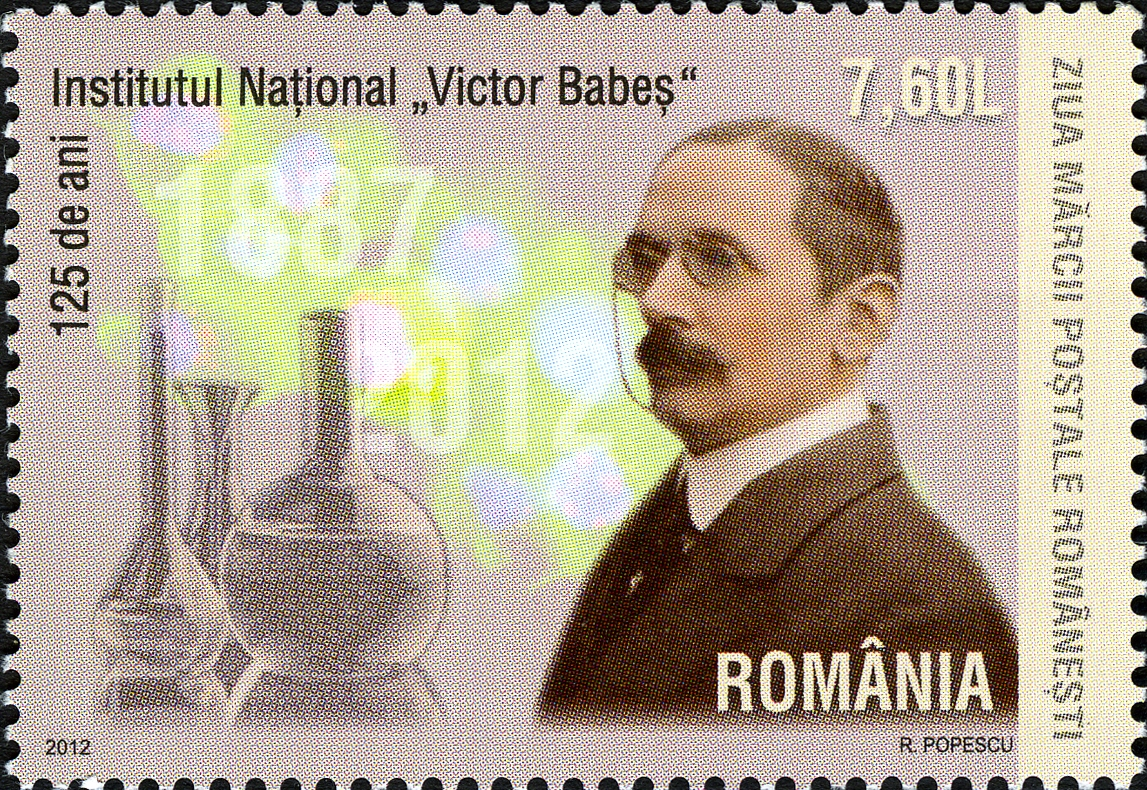
Stamp issued to commemorate the 125th anniversary of the founding of the Victor Babeș National Institute

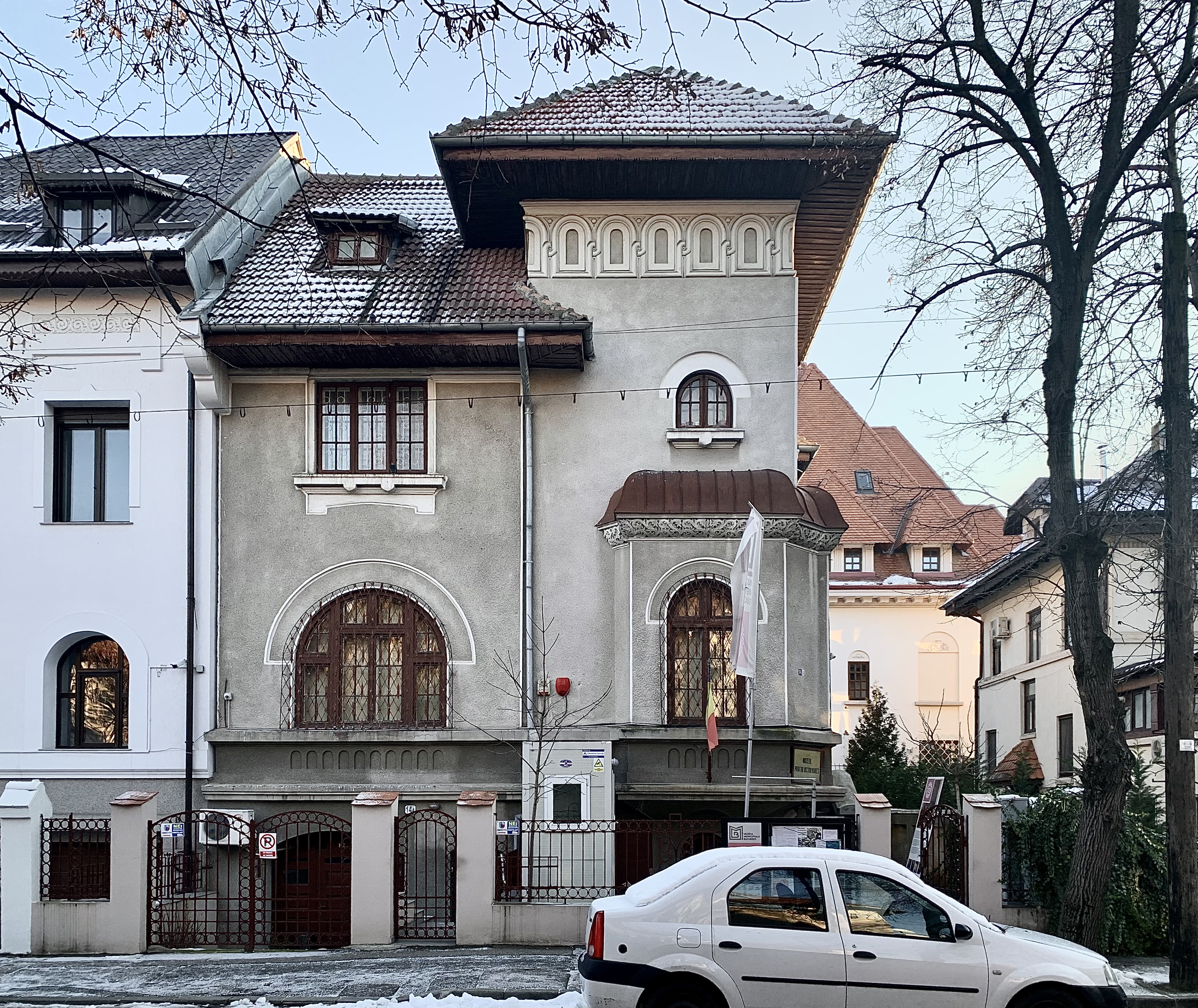
The memorial Victor Babeș museum on Strada Andrei Mureșan in Bucharest

He began his scientific career as an assistant in the Pathological Anatomy laboratory from Budapest (1874–1881). In 1885 he was appointed professor of histopathology at the Faculty of Medicine in Budapest. The same year, he discovered a parasitic sporozoan of the ticks, named Babesia in his honor (of the family Babesiidae), and which causes a rare and severe disease called babesiosis. Later that year, he published the first treatise of bacteriology in the world, Bacteria and their role in pathological anatomy and histology of infectious diseases, which he co-authored with Cornil.

Babeș's scientific endeavours were wide-ranging. He was the first to demonstrate the presence of tuberculous bacilli in the urine of infected patients. He also discovered cellular inclusions in rabies-infected nerve cells. Of diagnostic value, they were to be named after him (Babeș-Negri bodies). Babeș was the promoter of morphopathological conception about the infectious process, medical guidelines based on the synthesis between bacteriology and pathological anatomy. Babeș was credited with inventing the first rationalized model of thermostat and some methods for staining bacteria and fungi in histological preparations and cultures. During his time at the Budapest Medical University, he also wrote the first Hungarian-language bacteriology book.

In 1887, Babeș was called in the country by Romanian government and appointed professor of pathological anatomy and bacteriology at the Faculty of Medicine in Bucharest. He held this position until 1926. Also in 1887, by Law no. 1197, the Institute of Bacteriology and Pathology was established, headed by Babeș which would also bear his name in the future (Victor Babeș Institute). In 1889 he was elected corresponding member of the Romanian Academy, and from 1893 he became titular in this position.

In 1900 he founded the Anatomic Society in Bucharest, dealing with anatomical clinical studies. In 1913, he prepared a cholera vaccine to combat the cholera epidemic that broke out among Romanian Army that was in the campaign of the Second Balkan War in Bulgaria. Between 1916 and 1918 he continued the preparation of biological products, remaining in the area occupied by the Central Powers. In 1919 he was appointed professor at the University of Cluj, newly founded that year.

Victor Babeș introduced rabies vaccination in Romania, only three years after its initiation by Louis Pasteur. He is considered the second rabies specialist in the world after Pasteur and the father of serotherapy, precursor to modern immunology. His work also had a strong influence upon veterinary medicine, especially concerning prophylaxis and serum medication. He prepared the anti-diphtheria serum and conducted broad activity in researching pellagra, tuberculosis, typhoid fever and leprosy. He had published over 1,000 scientific papers and 25 monographs in the field of microbiology and pathology.

In recognition of his innovative work in medicine, Victor Babes was elected member of the French Académie nationale de médecine, of the International Committee for Combating Leprosy, and received three times the award of the French Academy of Sciences. Likewise, he was awarded the title of Knight of the Legion of Honor.

== Philosophical conceptions and militant attitude ==
Besides scientific work, he was closely concerned with the problems of prophylactic medicine (water supply of towns and villages, scientific organisation of the anti-epidemic fight, etc.). As director of the Institute that bears his name, Babeș has addressed some of the health and social problems of the time, such as pellagra problem, and formulated realistic solutions on the medical organisation of the country, foreseeing the organisation of a Ministry of Health. Closely linked with the people, Victor Babeș fought for applying the discoveries of science to improve people's lives. He studied the causes of diseases with mass spreading (pellagra, tuberculosis), drawing attention to their social roots.

Throughout the scientific and social activities, an important role he had was philosophical materialist conception, exposed especially in works like Considerations on the natural science's ratio to philosophy (1879) and Faith and science (1924). Babeș refuted Kant's agnosticism, Descartes' innatism, Schelling's idealist apriorism and fideism. He consistently supported the objective nature of the world, the laws of nature and causation.

Victor Babeș founded the publications Annals of the Institute of Pathology and Bacteriology (Romanian: Analele Institutului de Patologie și Bacteriologie; 1889), Medical Romania (Romanian: România medicală; 1893) and Archives of medical sciences (French: Archives des sciences médicales; 1895).

== Death ==
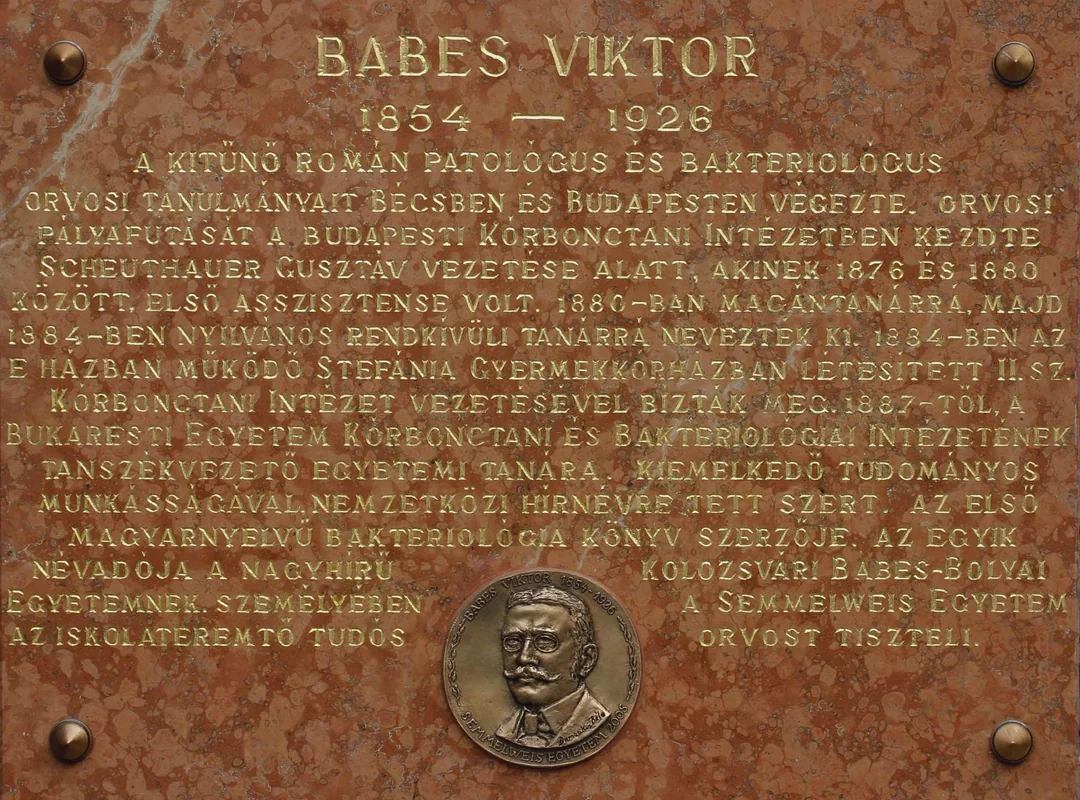
Memorial plaque at the First Children's Hospital in Budapest

Victor Babeș died on 19 October 1926 in Bucharest. His grave is at the Cantacuzino Institute of Bucharest.

== Eponyms ==
- Babeș-Ernst bodies: metachromatic inclusions in the cytoplasm of Gram-positive bacteria such as diphtheria
- Babeș-Negri bodies: inclusions in rabies-infected nervous cells
- Babesia: parasites of the family Hemosporidiae
- Babeș-Bolyai: main university in Cluj-Napoca

== Selected published works ==
- Über Poliomyelitis anterior, 1877
- Über die selbständige combinirte Seiten- und Hinterstrangsclerose des Rückenmarks, [Virchows] Archiv für pathologische Anatomie und Physiologie und für klinische Medicin, Berlin, 1876
- Über einen im menschlichen Peritoneum gefundenen Nematoden, [Virchows] Archiv für pathologische Anatomie und Physiologie und für klinische Medicin, Berlin, volume LXXXI
- Studien über Safraninfärbung, 1881
- Bakterien des rothen Schweisses, 1881
- Eine experimentelle Studie über den Einfluss des Nervensystems auf die pathologischen Veränderungen der Haut, with Arthur von Irsay, Vierteljahresschrift für Dermatologie
- Les bactéries et leur rôle dans l'anatomie et l'histologie pathologiques des maladies infectieuses, Written with Victor André Cornil, 1 volume and Atlas, Paris, F. Alcan, 1885
- Über isoliert färbbare Antheile von Bakterien, Zeitschrift für Hygiene, Leipzig, 1889, 5: 173–190
- Observations sur la morve, Archives de médecine experimentale et d'anatomie pathologique, 1891, 3:619–645
- Atlas der pathologischen Histologie des Nervensystems, with Georges Marinesco and Paul Oscar Blocq, Berlin, Hirschwald, 1892 OCLC 14787495
- Untersuchungen über Koch's Kommabacillus, [Virchows] Archiv für pathologische Anatomie und Physiologie und für klinische Medicin, Berlin
- Untersuchungen über den Leprabazillus und über die Histologie der Lepra, Berlin, 1898
- Beobachtungen über Riesenzellen, Stuttgart, 1905
- Über die Notwendigkeit der Abänderung des Pasteur'schen Verfahrens der Wutbehandlung, Zeitschrift für Hygiene und Infektionskrankheiten, Leipzig, 1908, 58:401–412.
