= Elie Carafoli =

Romanian engineer and aircraft designer (1901–1983)

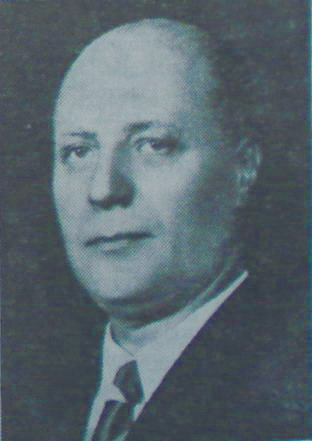

Elie Carafoli (September 15, 1901, Veria, Salonica Vilayet, Ottoman Empire–October 24, 1983, Bucharest, Romania) was an accomplished Romanian engineer and aircraft designer. He is considered a pioneering contributor to the field of aerodynamics.

== Biography ==
=== First years, education ===
Carafoli was of Aromanian descent. In 1915, he left Greece for Bitola, and then Bucharest, where he studied at Gheorghe Lazăr High School. In 1919 he entered University Politehnica of Bucharest, graduating with a degree in electrical engineering. He pursued his studies at the University of Paris, while also working at the Institut aérotechnique in Saint-Cyr-l'École, France. He obtained a Ph.D. in 1928, with a thesis entitled Contribution to the theory of aerodynamic lift.

=== Activity in Romania ===
In 1928, Carafoli returned to Bucharest, where he joined the faculty at the Polytechnic University, and founded the Aerodynamics chair; later in 1936 he was promoted to full professor. It was here that he built the first wind tunnel in South-Eastern Europe, and elaborated some of the theory on which calculations of wing profiles of supersonic aircraft are based.

From 1930 to 1937 Carafoli worked at Industria Aeronautică Română in Braşov. Together with Lucién Virmoux from Blériot Aéronautique, he designed the IAR CV-11, a single-seat, low-wing monoplane fighter aircraft. A prototype was flown in 1931 by Captain Romeo Popescu, in an attempt at breaking the flight airspeed record, but the plane crashed, and the pilot lost his life. Carafoli also designed the IAR 14 and IAR 15 aircraft, and later in 1937 initiated the development of the legendary IAR 80 fighter aircraft, at the urging of Prime Minister Armand Călinescu.

=== Recognition ===
In 1948, he was elected to the Romanian Academy. In 1949 he became director of the Institute of Applied Mechanics of the academy.

Carafoli was President of the International Astronautical Federation from 1968 to 1970. In 1971, he reorganized, along with Henri Coandă, the Department of Aeronautical Engineering of the Polytechnic University of Bucharest, spinning it off from the Department of Mechanical Engineering.

Carafoli was awarded the Louis Breguet Prize (Paris, 1927), the Gauss Medal, and the Apollo 11 Medal (1971).

== Selected publications ==
- Carafoli, Elie (1932). Recherches expérimentales sur les ailes monoplanes (exécutées à l'Institut aérotechnique de Saint-Cyr). Paris: E. Blondel La Rougery. OCLC 6705912.
- Carafoli, Elie (1956). High-speed aerodynamics, compressible flow. New York: Pergamon Press. OCLC 1455552.
- Nastase, Adriana; Carafoli, Elie; Mateescu, Dan (1969). Wing theory in supersonic flow. New York: Pergamon Press. ISBN 0-08-012330-9.
