= Lehmstedt–Tanasescu reaction =

Method in organic chemistry

The Lehmstedt–Tanasescu reaction is a method in organic chemistry for the organic synthesis of acridone derivatives (3) from a 2-nitrobenzaldehyde (1) and an arene compound (2):

The Lehmstedt–Tanasescu reaction

The reaction is named after two chemists who devoted part of their careers to research into this synthetic method, the German chemist Kurt Lehmstedt and the Romanian chemist Ion Tănăsescu. Variations of the reaction name include Lehmsted–Tănăsescu reaction, Lehmsted–Tănăsescu acridone synthesis and Lehmsted–Tanasescu acridone synthesis.

== Reaction mechanism ==
In the first step of the reaction mechanism the precursor molecule 2-nitrobenzaldehyde 4 is protonated, often by sulfuric acid, to intermediate 5, followed by an electrophilic attack to benzene (other arenes can be used as well). The resulting benzhydrol 6 cyclisizes to 7 and finally to compound 8. Treatment of this intermediate with nitrous acid (sodium nitrite in sulfuric acid) leads to the N-nitroso acridone 11 via intermediates 9 and 10. The N-nitroso group is removed by an acid in the final step. The procedure is an example of a one-pot synthesis.

Lehmstedt–Tanasescu reaction
