= Higraph =

A higraph is a diagramming object that formalizes relations into a visual structure. It was developed by David Harel in 1988. Higraphs extend mathematical graphs by including notions of depth and orthogonality. In particular, nodes in a higraph can contain other nodes inside them, creating a hierarchy. The idea was initially developed for applications to databases, knowledge representation, and the behavioral specification of complex concurrent systems using the higraph-based language of statecharts.

Higraphs are widely used in industrial applications like UML. Recently they have been used by philosophers to formally study the use of diagrams in mathematical proofs and reasoning.
