= Ion Tănăsescu (chemist) =

- Born: February 23, 1892; Bucharest, Romania
- Died: December 28, 1959 (aged 67); Bucharest, Romania
- Known for: Lehmstedt-Tanasescu reaction

Ion Tănăsescu (also Ioan) (February 23, 1892 – December 28, 1959) was a Romanian chemist.

He discovered the Lehmstedt-Tanasescu reaction, which was improved by Kurt Lehmstedt. He studied at the University of Bucharest and the University of Cluj. He was elected a titular member of the Romanian Academy in 1955.
