= Gabriel Sudan =

Romanian mathematician

Zürich 1932

Gabriel Sudan (April 14, 1899 – June 22, 1977) was a Romanian mathematician, known for the Sudan function, an important example in the theory of computation, similar to the Ackermann function.

Born in Bucharest, Sudan received his Ph.D. from the University of Göttingen in 1925 for his thesis Über die geordneten Mengen ("On the theory of ordered sets"), supervised by David Hilbert. He taught at the Polytechnic University of Bucharest from 1941 until his retirement, in 1966.

Sudan constructed the function that bears his name with the same aim as Wilhelm Ackermann: to solve in the affirmative a problem raised by Hilbert. The Ackermann and Sudan functions are chronologically the first examples of recursive functions which are not primitive recursive.

== Bibliography ==
- Ackermann, Wilhelm (1928). "Zum Hilbertschen Aufbau der reellen Zahlen". Mathematische Annalen. 99: 118–133. doi:10.1007/BF01459088. JFM 54.0056.06. S2CID 123431274.
- Calude, Cristian; Marcus, Solomon; Tevy, Ionel (1979). "The first example of a recursive function which is not primitive recursive". Historia Mathematica. 6 (4): 380–384. doi:10.1016/0315-0860(79)90024-7.
- Marcus, Solomon (2006). "Grigore C. Moisil: A life becoming a myth". International Journal of Computers Communications & Control. 1 (1): 73–79. doi:10.15837/ijccc.2006.1.2275.
- Sudan, Gabriel (1927). "Sur le nombre transfini ω^{ω}". Bulletin mathématique de la Société Roumaine des Sciences. 30: 11–30. JFM 53.0171.01. JSTOR 43769875. "Jbuch 53, 171"
