= Gheorghe Păun =

Romanian computer scientist

Gheorghe Păun (Romanian: [ˈɡe̯orɡe pəˈun]; born December 6, 1950, in Cicănești, Argeș County) is a computer scientist from Romania, prominent for work on membrane computing and the P system.

Păun studied mathematics at the University of Bucharest, obtaining an MSc. in 1974 and a PhD in 1977 under the direction of Solomon Marcus. He has been a researcher at the Institute of Mathematics of the Romanian Academy since 1990. Păun was elected a member of the Academia Europaea in 2006, and a titular member of the Romanian Academy in 2012. He supervised the PhD thesis of 5 students. In 2016, he was awarded the title of Doctor Honoris Causa Scientiarum.
