= Vincențiu Babeș =

Romanian lawyer, teacher, journalist and politician

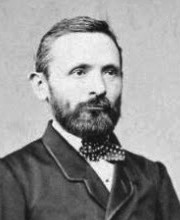
- Born: 21 January 1821; Hodony village, Temes County, Austria-Hungary (present day Hodoni, Timiș County, Romania)
- Died: 22 January 1907 (aged 86)
- Resting place: Hodoni, Timiș County, Romania
- Other name: Hungarian: Babes Vince
- Education: Royal University of Pest
- Occupations: Lawyer, teacher, journalist and politician
- Known for: Founding member of the Romanian Academy
- Political party: Romanian National Party
- Spouse: Sophia Goldschneider (m. 1851)
- Children: 9, including Victor Babeș

Vincențiu Babeș (also known in Hungarian: Babes Vince, 21 January 1821 – 22 January 1907) was an ethnic Romanian lawyer, teacher, journalist and politician from Hungary, and one of the founding members of the Romanian Academy.

He was born in 1821 in Hodony village, Temes County, Austria-Hungary (present day Hodoni, Timiș County, Romania), in the Banat. His father, Gheorghe Crâșmarul, died when he was young; he was then adopted by his grandfather, Mitra Babeș. After finishing primary school, Vincențiu Babeș attended German-language high schools, first in Temesvár, then in Szeged, where he took the baccalaureate in 1841. After that he attended theology courses in Karlóca and the Seminary in Arad. As he approached becoming a priest, Babeș changed his mind and enrolled at the Faculty of Law of Royal University of Pest in Budapest, from which he graduated with a law degree in 1848. Babeș then returned to Arad, where he worked first as a teacher and then as an inspector of the Romanian schools.

He was then sent to Vienna, together with other trusted men, as an advocate for the defense of the interests of the diocese of Arad and of the Romanian people from Maros-Torda County and Crișana. After settling in Vienna, he worked at the Supreme Court of Justice. In 1851 he married Sophia Goldschneider, with whom he had 9 children, the best known of which was Victor Babeș. In 1862 he moved to Budapest, where he practiced law, became involved in politics, and died in 1907. In 1937 his remains were brought back to his native village; his resting place is near the church in Hodoni.

Streets are named after him in Arad, Bucharest, Moșnița Veche, and Timișoara. A gymnasium and a high school in Timișoara also bear his name.
