= Sudan function =

In the theory of computation, the Sudan function is an example of a function that is recursive, but not primitive recursive. This is also true of the better-known Ackermann function.

In 1926, David Hilbert conjectured that every computable function was primitive recursive. This was refuted by Gabriel Sudan and Wilhelm Ackermann — both his students — using different functions that were published in quick succession: Sudan in 1927, Ackermann in 1928.

The Sudan function is the earliest published example of a recursive function that is not primitive recursive.

== Definition ==
$$\begin{array}{lll}
F_0 (x, y) & = x+y \\
F_{n+1} (x, 0) & = x & \text{if } n \ge 0 \\
F_{n+1} (x, y+1) & = F_n (F_{n+1} (x, y), F_{n+1} (x, y) + y + 1) & \text{if } n\ge 0 \\
\end{array}$$
The last equation can be equivalently written as
$$\begin{array}{lll}
F_{n+1} (x, y+1) & = F_n(F_{n+1} (x, y), F_0(F_{n+1}(x, y), y + 1)) \\
\end{array}$$.

== Computation ==
These equations can be used as rules of a term rewriting system (TRS).

The generalized function $F(x,y,n) \stackrel{\mathrm{def}}{=} F_n(x,y)$ leads to the rewrite rules

$$\begin{array}{lll}
\text{(r1)} & F(x, y, 0) & \rightarrow x+y \\
\text{(r2)} & F(x, 0, n+1) & \rightarrow x \\
\text{(r3)} & F(x, y+1, n+1) & \rightarrow F(F(x, y, n+1), F(F(x, y, n+1), y + 1,0), n) \\
\end{array}$$

At each reduction step the rightmost innermost occurrence of F is rewritten, by application of one of the rules (r1) - (r3).

Calude (1988) gives an example: compute $F(2,2,1) \rightarrow_{*} 12$.

The reduction sequence is

$\underline{{F(2,2,1)}}$
$\rightarrow_{r3} F(F(2,1,1),F(\underline{{F(2,1,1)}},2,0),0)$
$\rightarrow_{r3} F(F(2,1,1),F(F(F(2,0,1),F(\underline{{F(2,0,1)}},1,0),0),2,0),0)$
$\rightarrow_{r2} F(F(2,1,1),F(F(F(2,0,1),\underline{{F(2,1,0)}},0),2,0),0)$
$\rightarrow_{r1} F(F(2,1,1),F(F(\underline{{F(2,0,1)}},3,0),2,0),0)$
$\rightarrow_{r2} F(F(2,1,1),F(\underline{{F(2,3,0)}},2,0),0)$
$\rightarrow_{r1} F(F(2,1,1),\underline{{F(5,2,0)}},0)$
$\rightarrow_{r1} F(\underline{{F(2,1,1)}},7,0)$
$\rightarrow_{r3} F(F(F(2,0,1),F(\underline{{F(2,0,1)}},1,0),0),7,0)$
$\rightarrow_{r2} F(F(F(2,0,1),\underline{{F(2,1,0)}},0),7,0)$
$\rightarrow_{r1} F(F(\underline{{F(2,0,1)}},3,0),7,0)$
$\rightarrow_{r2} F(\underline{{F(2,3,0)}},7,0)$
$\rightarrow_{r1} \underline{{F(5,7,0)}}$
$\rightarrow_{r1} 12$

== Value tables ==
=== Values of F_{0} ===
F_{0}(x, y) = x + y

_{y} \ ^{x}	0	1	2	3	4	5	6	7	8	9	10
0	0	1	2	3	4	5	6	7	8	9	10
1	1	2	3	4	5	6	7	8	9	10	11
2	2	3	4	5	6	7	8	9	10	11	12
3	3	4	5	6	7	8	9	10	11	12	13
4	4	5	6	7	8	9	10	11	12	13	14
5	5	6	7	8	9	10	11	12	13	14	15
6	6	7	8	9	10	11	12	13	14	15	16
7	7	8	9	10	11	12	13	14	15	16	17
8	8	9	10	11	12	13	14	15	16	17	18
9	9	10	11	12	13	14	15	16	17	18	19
10	10	11	12	13	14	15	16	17	18	19	20

=== Values of F_{1} ===
F_{1}(x, y) = 2^{y} · (x + 2) − y − 2

_{y} \ ^{x}	0	1	2	3	4	5	6	7	8	9	10
0	0	1	2	3	4	5	6	7	8	9	10
1	1	3	5	7	9	11	13	15	17	19	21
2	4	8	12	16	20	24	28	32	36	40	44
3	11	19	27	35	43	51	59	67	75	83	91
4	26	42	58	74	90	106	122	138	154	170	186
5	57	89	121	153	185	217	249	281	313	345	377
6	120	184	248	312	376	440	504	568	632	696	760
7	247	375	503	631	759	887	1015	1143	1271	1399	1527
8	502	758	1014	1270	1526	1782	2038	2294	2550	2806	3062
9	1013	1525	2037	2549	3061	3573	4085	4597	5109	5621	6133
10	2036	3060	4084	5108	6132	7156	8180	9204	10228	11252	12276

=== Values of F_{2} ===
_{y} \ ^{x}	0	1	2	3	4	5	6	7
0	0	1	2	3	4	5	6	7
0	x							
1	F_{1} (F_{2}(0, 0), F_{2}(0, 0)+1)	F_{1} (F_{2}(1, 0), F_{2}(1, 0)+1)	F_{1} (F_{2}(2, 0), F_{2}(2, 0)+1)	F_{1} (F_{2}(3, 0), F_{2}(3, 0)+1)	F_{1} (F_{2}(4, 0), F_{2}(4, 0)+1)	F_{1} (F_{2}(5, 0), F_{2}(5, 0)+1)	F_{1} (F_{2}(6, 0), F_{2}(6, 0)+1)	F_{1} (F_{2}(7, 0), F_{2}(7, 0)+1)
1	F_{1}(0, 1)	F_{1}(1, 2)	F_{1}(2, 3)	F_{1}(3, 4)	F_{1}(4, 5)	F_{1}(5, 6)	F_{1}(6, 7)	F_{1}(7, 8)
1	1	8	27	74	185	440	1015	2294
1	2^{x+1} · (x + 2) − x − 3 ≈ 10^{lg 2·(x+1) + lg(x+2)}							
2	F_{1} (F_{2}(0, 1), F_{2}(0, 1)+2)	F_{1} (F_{2}(1, 1), F_{2}(1, 1)+2)	F_{1} (F_{2}(2, 1), F_{2}(2, 1)+2)	F_{1} (F_{2}(3, 1), F_{2}(3, 1)+2)	F_{1} (F_{2}(4, 1), F_{2}(4, 1)+2)	F_{1} (F_{2}(5, 1), F_{2}(5, 1)+2)	F_{1} (F_{2}(6, 1), F_{2}(6, 1)+2)	F_{1} (F_{2}(7, 1), F_{2}(7, 1)+2)
2	F_{1}(1, 3)	F_{1}(8, 10)	F_{1}(27, 29)	F_{1}(74, 76)	F_{1}(185, 187)	F_{1}(440, 442)	F_{1}(1015, 1017)	F_{1}(2294, 2296)
2	19	10228	15569256417	≈ 5,742397643 · 10^{24}	≈ 3,668181327 · 10^{58}	≈ 5,019729940 · 10^{135}	≈ 1,428323374 · 10^{309}	≈ 3,356154368 · 10^{694}
2	2^{2^{x+1}·(x+2) − x − 1} · (2^{x+1}·(x+2) − x − 1) − (2^{x+1}·(x+2) − x + 1) ≈ 10^{lg 2 · (2^{x+1}·(x+2) − x − 1) + lg(2^{x+1}·(x+2) − x − 1)} ≈ 10^{lg 2 · 2^{x+1}·(x+2) + lg(2^{x+1}·(x+2))} ≈ 10^{lg 2 · (2^{x+1}·(x+2))} = 10^{10^{lg lg 2 + lg 2·(x+1) + lg(x+2)}} ≈ 10^{10^{lg 2·(x+1) + lg(x+2)}}							
3	F_{1} (F_{2}(0, 2), F_{2}(0, 2)+3)	F_{1} (F_{2}(1, 2), F_{2}(1, 2)+3)	F_{1} (F_{2}(2, 2), F_{2}(2, 2)+3)	F_{1} (F_{2}(3, 2), F_{2}(3, 2)+3)	F_{1} (F_{2}(4, 2), F_{2}(4, 2)+3)	F_{1} (F_{2}(5, 2), F_{2}(5, 2)+3)	F_{1} (F_{2}(6, 2), F_{2}(6, 2)+3)	F_{1} (F_{2}(7, 2), F_{2}(7, 2)+3)
3	F_{1}(F_{1}(1,3), F_{1}(1,3)+3)	F_{1}(F_{1}(8,10), F_{1}(8,10)+3)	F_{1}(F_{1}(27,29), F_{1}(27,29)+3)	F_{1}(F_{1}(74,76), F_{1}(74,76)+3)	F_{1}(F_{1}(185,187), F_{1}(185,187)+3)	F_{1}(F_{1}(440,442), F_{1}(440,442)+3)	F_{1}(F_{1}(1015,1017), F_{1}(1015,1017)+3)	F_{1}(F_{1}(2294,2297), F_{1}(2294,2297)+3)
3	F_{1}(19, 22)	F_{1}(10228, 10231)	F_{1}(15569256417, 15569256420)	F_{1}(≈6·10^{24}, ≈6·10^{24})	F_{1}(≈4·10^{58}, ≈4·10^{58})	F_{1}(≈5·10^{135}, ≈5·10^{135})	F_{1}(≈10^{309}, ≈10^{309})	F_{1}(≈3·10^{694}, ≈3·10^{694})
3	88080360	≈ 7,04 · 10^{3083}	≈ 7,82 · 10^{4686813201}	≈ 10^{1,72·10^{24}}	≈ 10^{1,10·10^{58}}	≈ 10^{1,51·10^{135}}	≈ 10^{4,30·10^{308}}	≈ 10^{1,01·10^{694}}
3	longer expression, starts with 2^{2^{2^{x+1}}} an, ≈ 10^{10^{10^{lg 2·(x+1) + lg(x+2)}}}							
4	F_{1} (F_{2}(0, 3), F_{2}(0, 3)+4)	F_{1} (F_{2}(1, 3), F_{2}(1, 3)+4)	F_{1} (F_{2}(2, 3), F_{2}(2, 3)+4)	F_{1} (F_{2}(3, 3), F_{2}(3, 3)+4)	F_{1} (F_{2}(4, 3), F_{2}(4, 3)+4)	F_{1} (F_{2}(5, 3), F_{2}(5, 3)+4)	F_{1} (F_{2}(6, 3), F_{2}(6, 3)+4)	F_{1} (F_{2}(7, 3), F_{2}(7, 3)+4)
4	F_{1} (F_{1}(19, 22), F_{1}(19, 22)+4)	F_{1} (F_{1}(10228, 10231), F_{1}(10228, 10231)+4)	F_{1} (F_{1}(15569256417, 15569256420), F_{1}(15569256417, 15569256420)+4)	F_{1} (F_{1}(≈5,74·10^{24}, ≈5,74·10^{24}), F_{1}(≈5,74·10^{24}, ≈5,74·10^{24}))	F_{1} (F_{1}(≈3,67·10^{58}, ≈3,67·10^{58}), F_{1}(≈3,67·10^{58}, ≈3,67·10^{58}))	F_{1} (F_{1}(≈5,02·10^{135}, ≈5,02·10^{135}), F_{1}(≈5,02·10^{135}, ≈5,02·10^{135}))	F_{1} (F_{1}(≈1,43·10^{309}, ≈1,43·10^{309}), F_{1}(≈1,43·10^{309}, ≈1,43·10^{309}))	F_{1} (F_{1}(≈3,36·10^{694}, ≈3,36·10^{694}), F_{1}(≈3,36·10^{694}, ≈3,36·10^{694}))
4	F_{1}(88080360, 88080364)	F_{1}(10230·2^{10231}−10233, 10230·2^{10231}−10229)						
4	≈ 3,5 · 10^{26514839}							
4	much longer expression, starts with 2^{2^{2^{2^{x+1}}}} an, ≈ 10^{10^{10^{10^{lg 2·(x+1) + lg(x+2)}}}}							

=== Values of F_{3} ===
_{y} \ ^{x}	0	1	2	3	4
0	0	1	2	3	4
0	x				
1	F_{2} (F_{3}(0, 0), F_{3}(0, 0)+1)	F_{2} (F_{3}(1, 0), F_{3}(1, 0)+1)	F_{2} (F_{3}(2, 0), F_{3}(2, 0)+1)	F_{2} (F_{3}(3, 0), F_{3}(3, 0)+1)	F_{2} (F_{3}(4, 0), F_{3}(4, 0)+1)
1	F_{2}(0, 1)	F_{2}(1, 2)	F_{2}(2, 3)	F_{2}(3, 4)	F_{2}(4, 5)
1	1	10228	≈ 7,82 · 10^{4686813201}		
1	No closed expressions possible within the framework of normal mathematical notation				
2	F_{3} (F_{4}(0, 1), F_{4}(0, 1)+2)	F_{3} (F_{4}(1, 1), F_{4}(1, 1)+2)	F_{3} (F_{4}(2, 1), F_{4}(2, 1)+2)	F_{3} (F_{4}(3, 1), F_{4}(3, 1)+2)	F_{3} (F_{4}(4, 1), F_{4}(4, 1)+2)
2	F_{3} (1, 3)	F_{3} (10228, 10230)	F_{3} (≈10^{4686813201}, ≈10^{4686813201})		
2	No closed expressions possible within the framework of normal mathematical notation				

== Bibliography ==
- Ackermann, Wilhelm (1928). "Zum Hilbertschen Aufbau der reellen Zahlen". Mathematische Annalen. 99: 118–133. doi:10.1007/BF01459088. JFM 54.0056.06. S2CID 123431274.
- Calude, Cristian; Marcus, Solomon; Tevy, Ionel (1979). "The first example of a recursive function which is not primitive recursive". Historia Mathematica. 6 (4): 380–384. doi:10.1016/0315-0860(79)90024-7.
- Calude, Cristian (1988). Theories of Computational Complexity. Amsterdam: North-Holland. ISBN 978-0-444-70356-9.
- Sudan, Gabriel (1927). "Sur le nombre transfini ω^{ω}". Bulletin mathématique de la Société Roumaine des Sciences. 30: 11–30. JFM 53.0171.01. JSTOR 43769875. "Jbuch 53, 171"
