= Eugen Pavel =

Romanian scientist

Eugen Pavel is a Romanian scientist and inventor of the Hyper CD-ROM.

Pavel graduated with a physics degree from the University of Bucharest in 1976. He was awarded the Romanian Academy Prize in 1991 and obtained his doctorate in Physics from the Romanian Institute of Atomic Physics in 1992.

== Hyper CD-ROM ==
The Hyper CD-ROM is a proposed 3D optical data storage medium which uses Fluorescent Multilayer Disc technology with a reported capacity of 1PB and a theoretical capacity of 100 EB on a single disc.

In an interview about his work on the Hyper CD-ROM, Dr. Pavel stated that "the research for this project is 100% personal, [and] so is the support for experiments."
