= Hyper CD-ROM =

Optical data storage device

Hyper CD-ROM (Petabyte Optical Disc)
- Media type: 3D optical disc
- Capacity: 1 PB, theoretically up to 100 EB
- Read mechanism: based on controlled fluorescence extinction, 300 Mbit/s
- Write mechanism: based on controlled fluorescence extinction, 300 Mbit/s
- Developed by: Storex Technologies, CEO Eugen Pavel
- Dimensions: 10 mm ø 120 mm
- Usage: Data storage, video, audio

The Hyper CD-ROM is a claimed optical data storage device similar to the CD-ROM with a multilayer 3D structure, invented by Romanian scientist Eugen Pavel.

The technology is supposedly similar to FMD discs. The bit of data being held as a change in fluorescence characteristics once irradiated with one or two lasers. The target is irradiated with a pulse of laser(s) then a CCD or photodiode wait for an emitted light by the medium due to the fluorescence effect (bit value set to "1" if emitted, else "0").

== Characteristics ==
The reported storage capacity of one such disk is 1 000 000 GB (1 PB), as storage occurs on 2 000 different levels layered inside the glass body of the disk.

It claims to use fluorescent photosensitive material (glass enhanced with rare earth or vitroceramic enhanced with photosensitizing metals) as storage medium.

The Hyper CD-ROM technology is patented in 21 countries: the United States, Canada, Japan, Israel and 17 European states.

Despite its bold claims, the technology has not been shown as a working prototype in the over twenty years since its announcement and there has been no commercial production.

In an interview about his work on the Hyper CD-ROM, Pavel stated that "the research for this project is 100% personal, [and] so is the support for experiments."
