= IAR 14 =

Romanian fighter and trainer aircraft

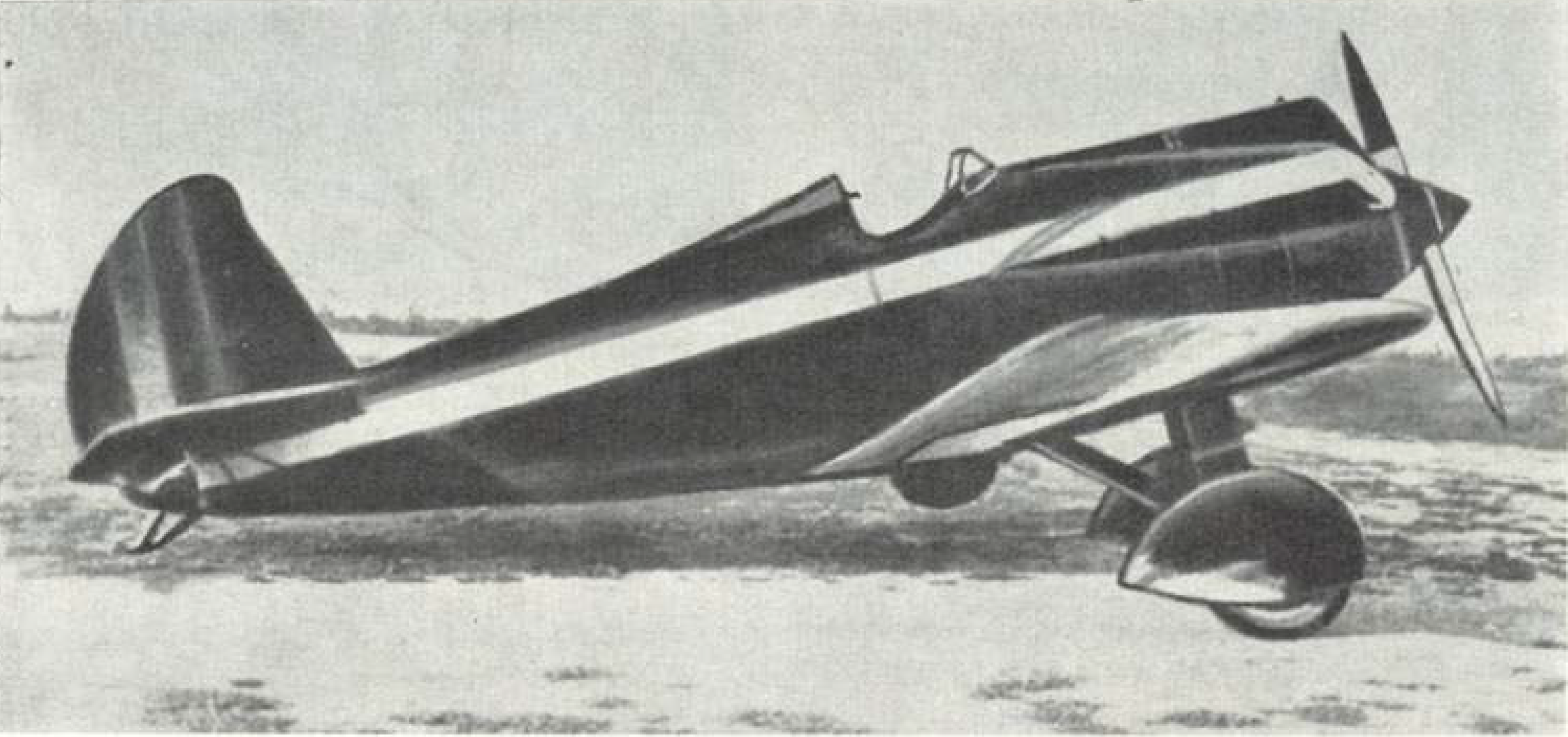

General information
- Type: Fighter-trainer aircraft
- Manufacturer: Industria Aeronautică Română (IAR)
- Primary user: Royal Romanian Air Force

History
- Manufactured: 20
- First flight: June 1933
- Developed from: IAR 12

The IAR 14 is a Romanian low-wing monoplane fighter-trainer aircraft designed before World War II.

== Design and development ==
After rejection of IAR 12, Romanian officials did not want to discourage eventual national aircraft production. Therefore, in early 1933, an unofficial message was forwarded from top levels to Brasov, essentially indicating that a small number of fighter-trainers would be purchased by the air force. The I.A.R. team immediately began to work on a new type, designated I.A.R. 14, still based on the experience gained with previous designs

The airplane was designed by IAR design bureau in 1933 and was an evolution from the IAR 12 prototype. It was a cantilever low-winged monoplane with a spatted main undercarriage with V-form legs and a single, open cockpit over the wing. The rectangular section fuselage was of mixed metal-wood configuration, with the front half covered by duralumin sheets and the rear part with pine plywood. The tail had been modified once more and the control surfaces were balanced. The pilot's head rest was not fitted with the anti-crash pylon, typical to the precedent prototypes. The engine was mounted on welded steel bearers attached to a duralumin fireproof bulkhead. The wings were built around twin duralumin spars and pine and plywood ribs and had plywood leading edges. The centre section, let into the fuselage underside was duralumin covered, outer sections and ailerons fabric-covered. The fixed tail was built of pine and plywood-covered, the moving surfaces duralumin with fabric cover.

The aircraft was equipped with the IAR LD 450 powerplant, produced under license by IAR, that also equipped the IAR 12. The first flight took place in June 1933. In September 1933, an order for 20 aircraft was placed.

== Operators ==
Romania

- Royal Romanian Air Force

== Specifications (IAR 14) ==
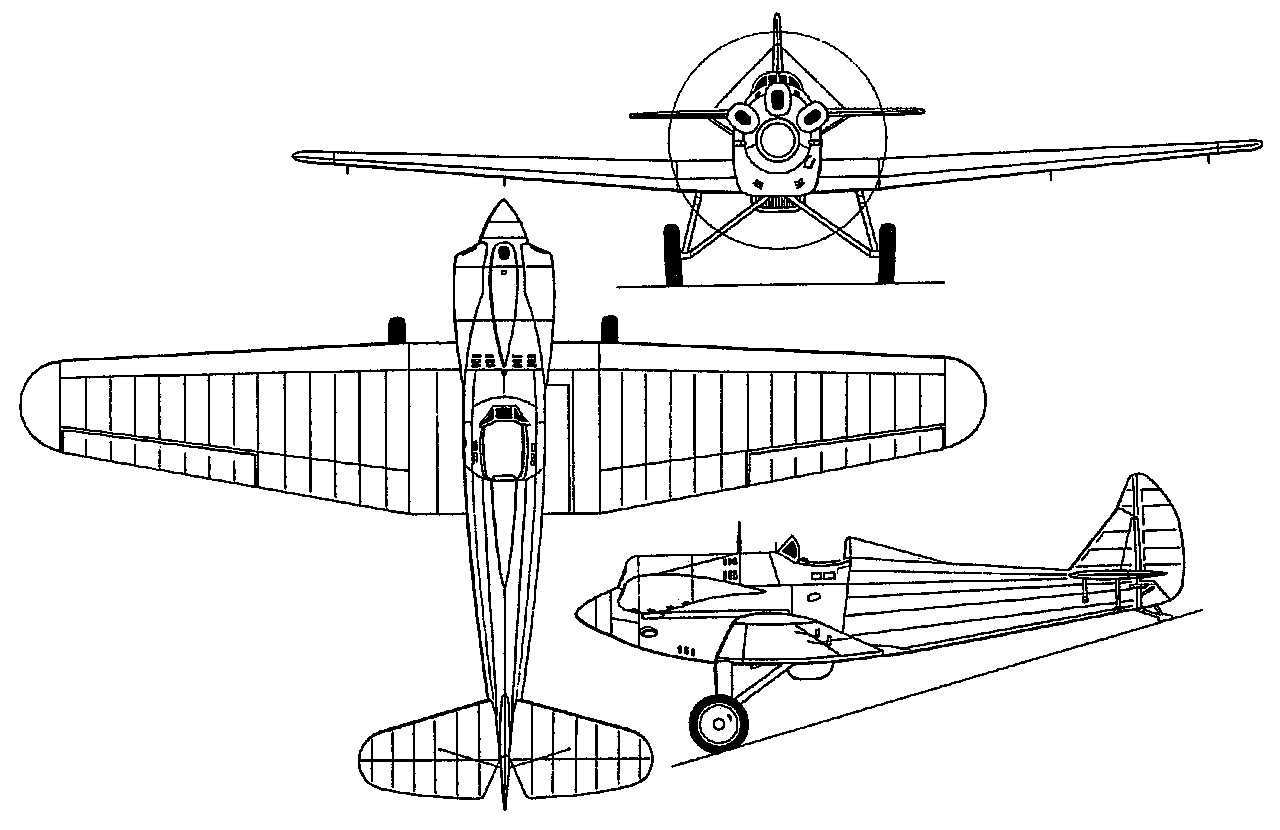

Data from Jane's all the World's Aircraft 1938

General characteristics

- Crew: 1
- Length: 7.37 m (24 ft 2 in)
- Wingspan: 11.7 m (38 ft 5 in)
- Height: 2.6 m (8 ft 6 in)
- Wing area: 20.3 m^{2} (219 sq ft)
- Empty weight: 1,255 kg (2,767 lb)
- Gross weight: 1,552 kg (3,422 lb)
- Fuel capacity: 230 L (61 US gal; 51 imp gal)
- Powerplant: 1 × IAR LD 450 W-12 water-cooled piston engine, 340 kW (450 hp) (Lorraine 12Eb)
- Propellers: 2-bladed Ratier wooden fixed-pitch propeller

Performance

- Maximum speed: 294 km/h (183 mph, 159 kn) at sea level

265 km/h (165 mph; 143 kn) at 5,000 m (16,000 ft)

- Minimum speed: 110 km/h (68 mph; 59 kn) at sea level
- Endurance: 2 hours 10 minutes
- Service ceiling: 7,900 m (25,900 ft)
- Time to altitude: 5,000 m (16,000 ft) in 10 minutes 27 seconds
- Wing loading: 76.5 kg/m^{2} (15.7 lb/sq ft)
- Power/mass: 0.217 kW/kg (0.132 hp/lb)

Armament

- Guns: 2 x 7.7 mm Vickers machine-guns in the nose of the aircraft firing through airscrew.

== See also ==
Related development

- IAR 12

Aircraft of comparable role, configuration, and era

- Boeing P-26
- Dewoitine D.500
- Avia BH-3

== Bibliography ==
- Cortet, Pierre (June 1976). "Les chasseurs I.A.R: à la mode "Jockey" des années 30, mais en Roumanie (2)" [The I.A.R Fighters: In the Jockey Style of the Thirties, but in Romania, Part 2]. Le Fana de l'Aviation (in French) (79): 10–13. ISSN 0757-4169.
