= IAR CV 11 =

Romanian fighter prototype

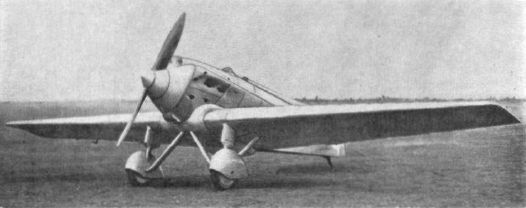

General information
- Type: Fighter
- National origin: Romania
- Manufacturer: IAR (Industria Aeronautică Română)
- Designer: Elie Carafoli; Lucien Virmoux
- Primary user: Romania
- Number built: 2

History
- Introduction date: never
- First flight: 1930

The IAR CV 11 was a Romanian fighter prototype in 1930, designed by Elie Carafoli and Lucien Virmoux (their initials giving the plane the CV designation). It was IAR's first original aircraft.

== Development ==
In early 1930 a contest was called by the Royal Romanian Air Force for a new fighter type to equip its squadrons. During July and October, seven foreign types were tested at an airfield near Bucharest. No decision was made, however, since none of the contenders reached the minimal speed limit set by the requirements at 300 km/h (190 mph; 160 kn). Despite the inconclusive results, the favourite plane seemed to be the chunky-looking Polish P.Z.L. P.1/II prototype, registered SP-ADO. During the same period, the air force commission was informed that a new fighter prototype had been completed at I.A.R., and it had reached an impressive 319 km/h (198 mph; 172 kn) top speed during initial test flights.

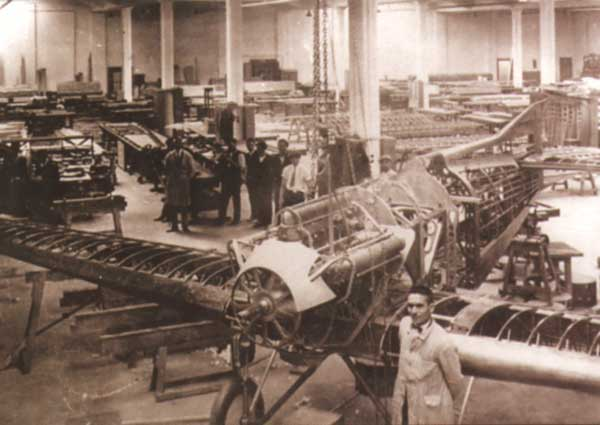
The IAR CV 11 being assembled at the IAR Brașov factory

Built according to the plans of Dipl.-Eng. Dr. Elie Carafoli and Lucien Virmoux, the I.A.R. fighter was an advanced construction. Named the C.V. 11 after its designers, it had a mixed metal-wood structure and cantilever, low-wing configuration, modern features soon to be adopted by all major aircraft manufacturers. The front fuselage structure was made of duraluminum tubes, while the rear part was of pinewood. The engine nacelle and the fuselage up to the cockpit were covered by duraluminum sheets, the aft part by plywood. The rear part of the fuselage merged with the tail without a substantial cross-sectional change, giving the aircraft a rather unusual arrow-like look. Due to its unconventional fuselage configuration the overall length came to less than 7 m, while the height was only 2.46 m (8 ft 1 in). The 11.5 m (38 ft) span wing was made up by three sections of combined duraluminum/pinewood construction, reinforced by steel cables. The centre part housed the main wing fuel tank. The unbalanced control surfaces, which proved to be too small during trials, were made entirely of wood covered by fabric.

The powerplant chosen was a Lorraine-Dietrich 12Fa Courlis with 12 cylinders arranged in a W configuration. Its maximum output was an impressive 600 hp (450 kW) but it proved to be too heavy for the small and light fuselage, which weighted only 1,100 kg (2,400 lb), and caused a dangerous tendency to go into a spin at low speed. This shortcoming could not be eliminated, so the prototype, officially designated I.A.R. C.V. 11/W.8, had finally to be abandoned.

In the meantime, a second prototype was completed at I.A.R. This time a less powerful but sensibly lighter Hispano-Suiza 12Mc engine, with 12-cylinders in V, had been fitted to essentially the same fuselage. Although weaker than its predecessor, this engine gave a superior maximum speed of 328 km/h at sea level and 295 km/h at 5,000 m.

The armament of two 7.7 mm (0.303 in) Vickers machine guns firing through the propeller arc had been retained from the first prototype. An O.P.L. type gunsight helped the pilot to aim its guns.

After initial test flights, the second prototype, designated in French style I.A.R. C.V. 11 C1 (Chasseur monoplace), had been shipped to Istres, in France, where it arrived in January 1931. During the following two months further trials were conducted involving French specialists as well.

The French specialists report, however, did not have any significant effect on ARR commission members. After the initial failure in reaching a verdict, this prompted the ARR leaders to set up a new, five member committee to decide the choice of fighter type to be introduced into Romanian service. After several months of inquiries and test flights, the commission finally decided four to one in favour of the P.Z.L. P.1 and against the faster but less manoeuvrable, spin-prone I.A.R. C.V. 11.

Therefore, once the prototype returned to Romania, as a last measure, the I.A.R. team decided to make an attempt to break the speed record on a 500 km (310 mi) closed circuit. The record of 306.696 km/h (190.572 mph; 165.603 kn) in effect at that time for this category had been set up by the Frenchman Joseph Sadi-Lecointe, with a Nieuport-Delage NiD 42 airplane.

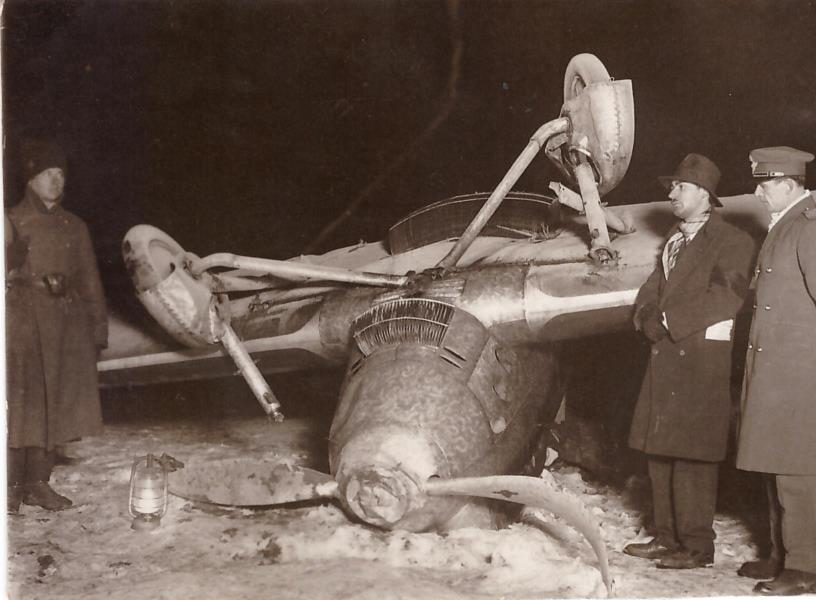
The aircraft after the accident

The record-breaking attempt was scheduled for the morning of 9 December 1931 on the Bucharest-Fetești-Bucharest route. With the Capitan aviator Romeo Popescu at its controls, the C.V. 11 took off from Pipera-Bucharest military airfield at 11.30 a.m. The first 370 km were flown without any trouble at an encouraging average speed. Close to Lehliu railway station, however, the overheated Hispano-Suiza engine suddenly stalled, forcing the pilot to try an improvised forced landing with the now vicious airplane. Cpt. Popescu approached a nearby open field, but at contact with the thick snow cover one of the main wheels collapsed and the fighter turned over, crushing the pilot under the fuselage. Romeo Popescu, an experienced test pilot and holder of three Romanian national aviation records, died instantly. The investigation following the incident concluded that the lubrication of the overstressed engine, working at maximum power, was insufficient, causing seizure. Until that fatal moment, during an hour and thirty-four minutes of flight, an average speed of 319 km/h had been recorded by the onboard instruments, thus a good chance had existed of achieving the goal set by the temerarious pilot.

However, by that time the dice had already been cast. Months before, in September 1931, General Constantin Lazarescu, the new inspector of DSA, decided not to consider the I.A.R. design any more, but to purchase the Polish P.Z.L. P.11, an upgraded version of the initial P.1.

== Specifications (CV 11 with HS 12Mc engine) ==
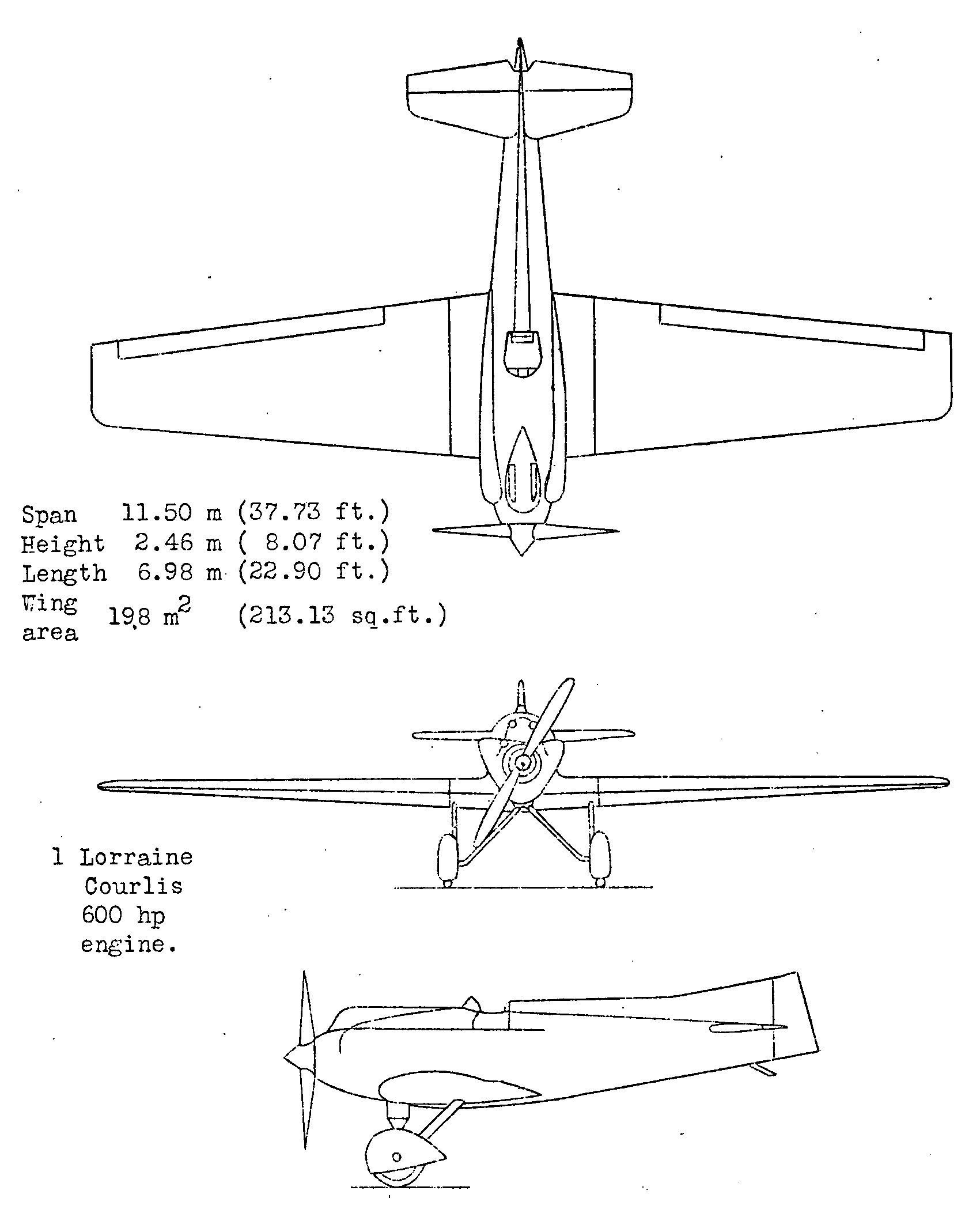
IAR CV 11 3-view drawing from NACA Aircraft Circular No.144

Data from Jane's all the World's Aircraft 1931

General characteristics

- Crew: 1
- Length: 6.98 m (22 ft 11 in)
- Wingspan: 11.5 m (37 ft 9 in)
- Height: 2.46 m (8 ft 1 in)
- Wing area: 19.8 m^{2} (213 sq ft)
- Empty weight: 1,100 kg (2,425 lb)
- Gross weight: 1,510 kg (3,329 lb)
- Powerplant: 1 × Hispano-Suiza 12Mc V-12 water-cooled piston engine, 370 kW (500 hp)
- Propellers: 2-bladed variable-pitch propeller

Performance

- Maximum speed: 329.7 km/h (204.9 mph, 178.0 kn)
- Stall speed: 109.5 km/h (68.0 mph, 59.1 kn)
- Service ceiling: 9,500 m (31,200 ft)
- Absolute ceiling: 9,800 m (32,200 ft)
- Time to altitude: 1,000 m (3,300 ft) in 1 minute 12 seconds

5,000 m (16,000 ft) in 7 minute 57 seconds
1,000 m (3,300 ft) in 19 minute 22 seconds

- Wing loading: 83 kg/m^{2} (17 lb/sq ft)
- Power/mass: 5.5 lb/hp (3.3 kg/kW)

Armament

- Guns: 2 x 0.303 in (7.70 mm) Vickers machine guns
