= Țițeica =

Țițeica is a Romanian-language surname. Notable people with the surname include:

- Gheorghe Țițeica (1873–1939), Romanian mathematician
- Șerban Țițeica (1908–1985), Romanian physicist, son of Gheorghe
