= Bellu Cemetery =

Largest cemetery in Bucharest, Romania

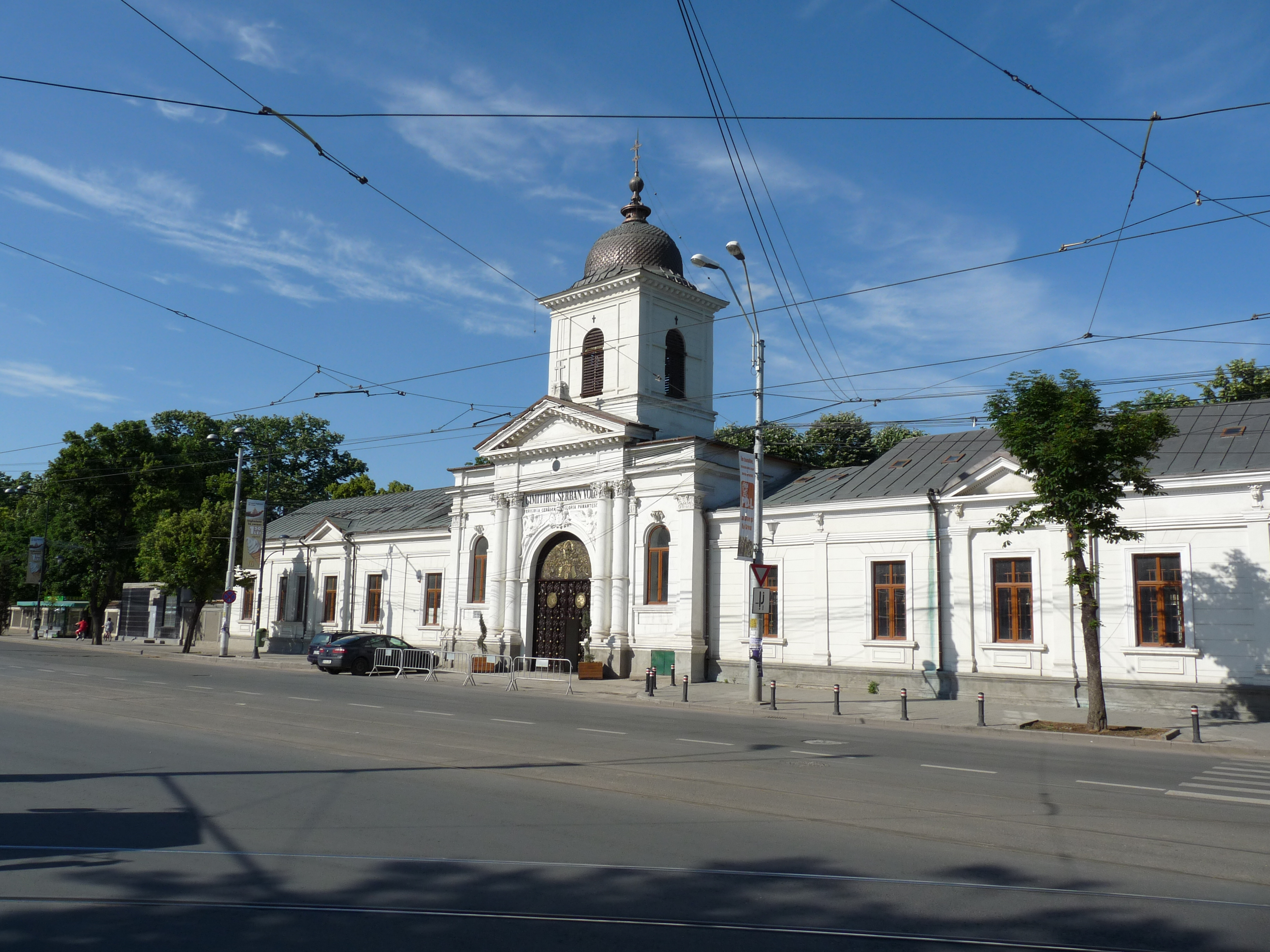
- Entrance to Bellu Cemetery
- Interactive map of Bellu Cemetery

Details
- Established: 1858
- Location: Șerban Vodă Way, Sector 4, Bucharest
- Country: Romania
- Coordinates: 44°24′14″N 26°06′00″E
- Type: Public
- Size: 28 ha (69 acres)

Famous graves

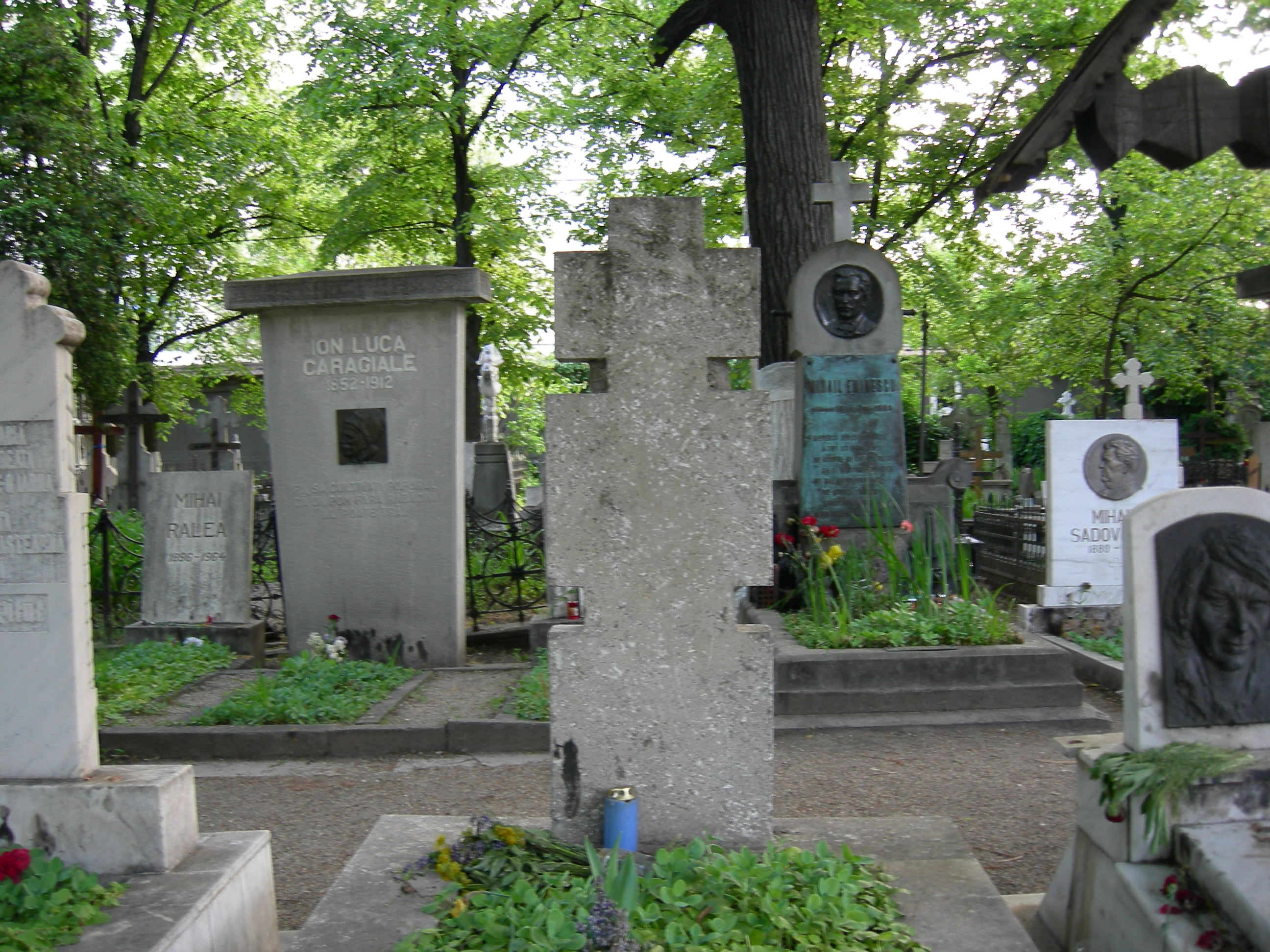
Alley of Artists, from left to right: Ion Luca Caragiale, Mihai Eminescu and Mihail Sadoveanu

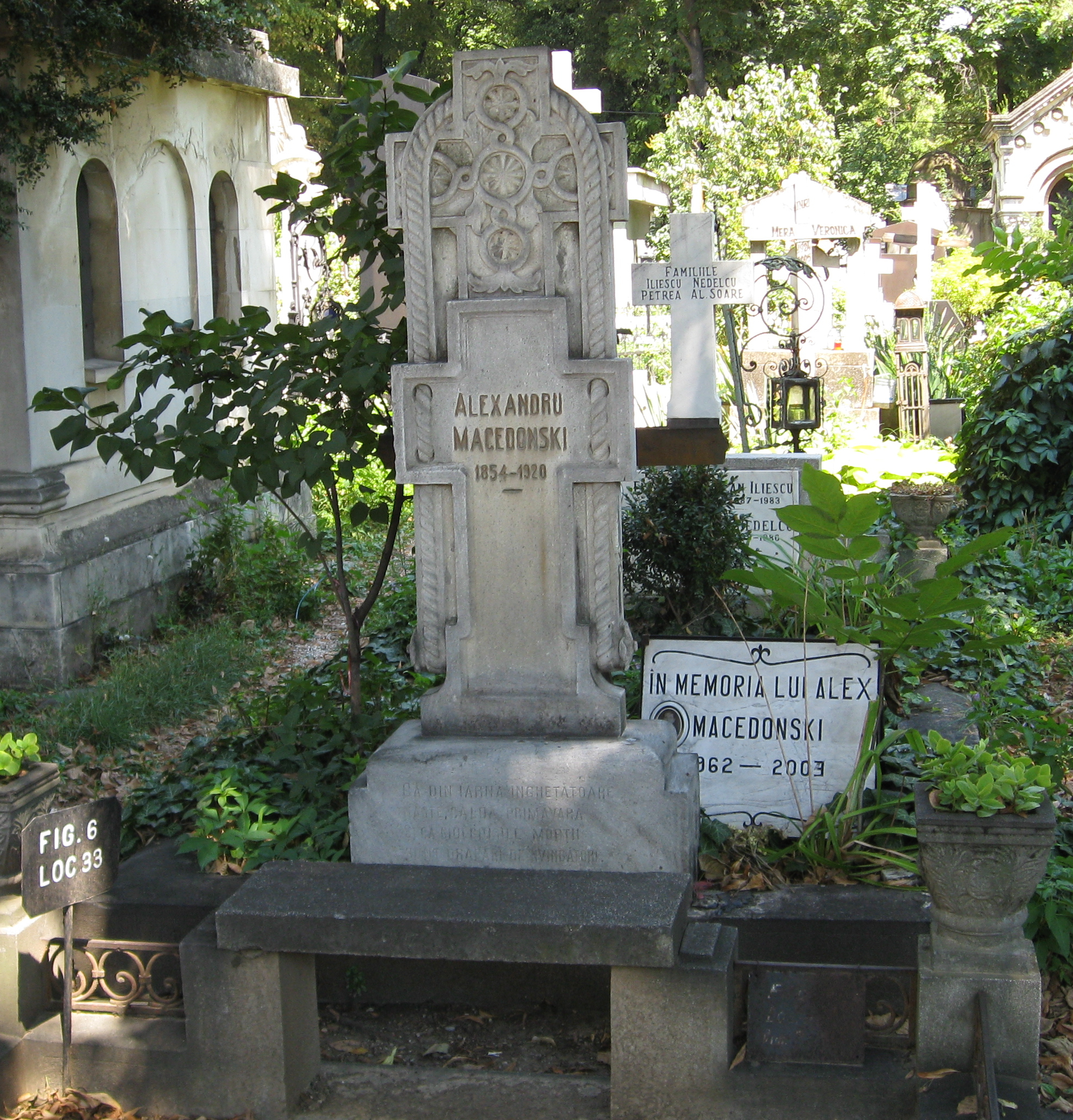
Alexandru Macedonski

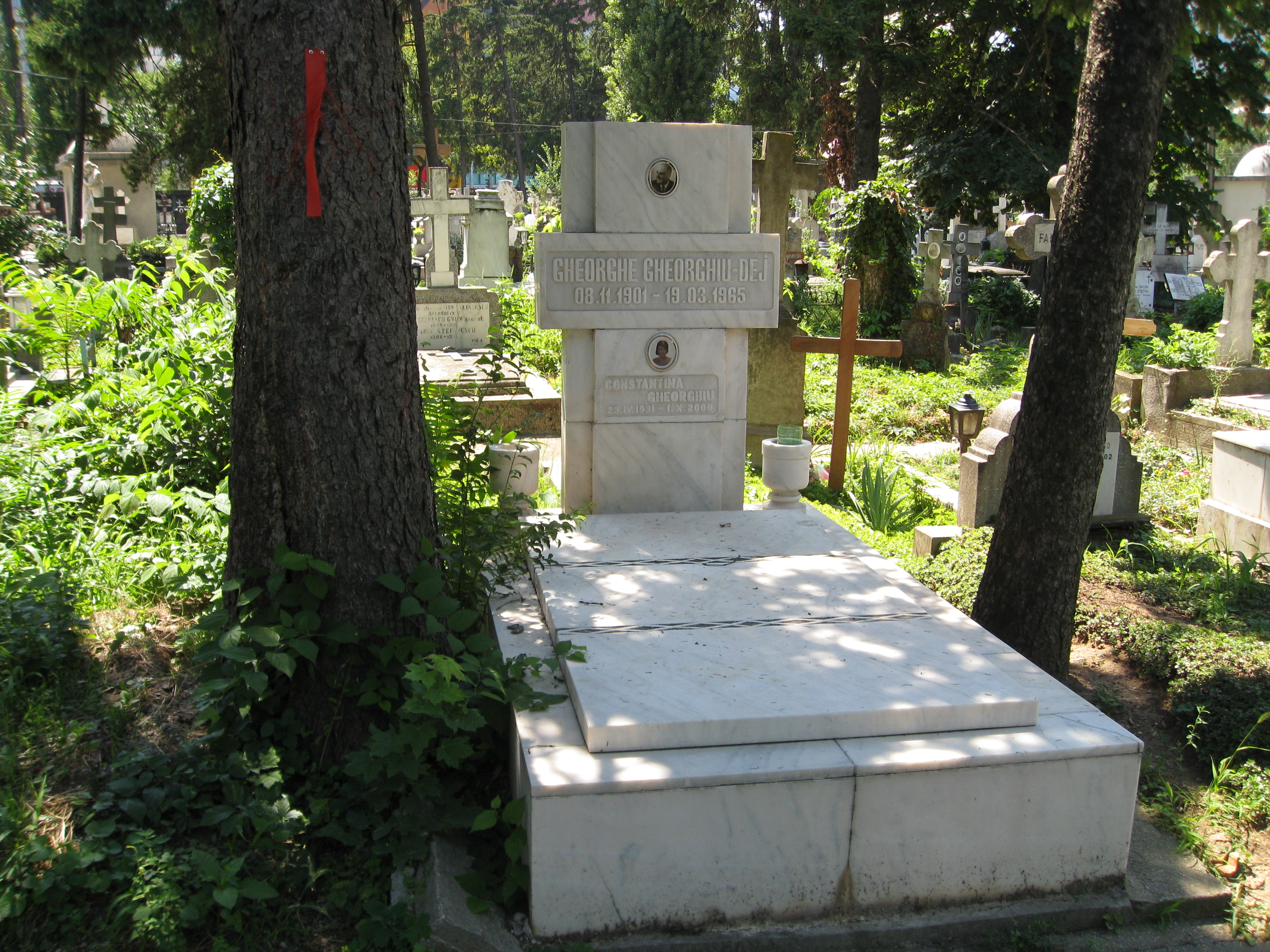
Gheorghe Gheorghiu-Dej

Șerban Vodă Cemetery (commonly known as Bellu Cemetery) is the largest and most famous cemetery in Bucharest, Romania.

== Background ==
At the beginning of the 19th century, the plot of land used to be a garden owned by the family of Baron Barbu Bellu. The garden was a popular place for parties and the area became known as "la Bellu" (at Bellu's). A widespread myth is that Baron Bellu had donated the plot to the city council for building the cemetery, but documents show the land had been sold to the Church in 1840, more than a decade before landscaping work began. The cemetery has been in use since 1858. The cemetery covers 28 hectares (69 acres) and it is a cultural attraction in Bucharest.

== Opening hours ==
The cemetery is open every day from 8:30 AM to 8 PM. On public holidays, the visiting hours may differ.

== Notable interments ==
=== A ===
- Elena Alistar, physician and politician
- Theodor Aman, painter and illustrator
- Ana Aslan, biologist and physician

=== B ===
- Aurel Babeș, scientist and physician
- Anton Bacalbașa, journalist and politician
- George Bacovia, writer
- Ioan Bălan, bishop
- Constantin Bălăceanu-Stolnici, neurologist
- Leopoldina Bălănuță, actress
- Daniel Barbu, political scientist, academic, and politician
- Eugen Barbu, journalist, polemicist, novelist, and politician
- Tita Bărbulescu, singer
- Ion Barbu, poet and mathematician
- Marga Barbu, actress
- Radu Beligan, actor
- Barbu Bellu, baron, jurist, and politician
- Carol Benesch, architect
- Ion Besoiu, actor
- Andrei Blaier, director and scenarist
- Corneliu Bogdan, diplomat
- Lucian Bolcaș, lawyer and politician
- Emil Botta, actor and writer
- Dimitrie Brândză, botanist
- Ioan Alexandru Brătescu-Voinești, writer
- Ioana Bulcă, actress
- Theodor Burghele, surgeon and academic
- Augustin Buzura, novelist

=== C ===
- Eusebiu Camilar, writer and translator
- Gheorghe Cantacuzino-Grănicerul, general, politician, and member of the Iron Guard
- Șerban Cantacuzino, actor
- Ion Luca Caragiale, playwright, novelist, pamphleteer, theater director, political commentator, and journalist
- Toma Caragiu, actor
- Ion Caramitru, actor
- Lascăr Catargiu, Prime Minister
- Vladimir Cavarnali, poet, editor, and political figure
- Jules Cazaban, actor
- Anda Călugăreanu, actress and singer
- Radu Câmpeanu, economist, jurist, and politician
- Constantin Cândea, chemist
- Maria Cândea, doctor of letters and school director
- Alexandru Cernat, general and politician
- Maria Cicherschi Ropală, doctor and professor
- George Ciprian, actor and playwright
- Radu Ciuceanu, historian and politician
- Liviu Ciulei, director, actor, scenographer, architect, and professor
- Cornel Ciupercescu, actor
- Henri Coandă, engineer, physicist, inventor, and aviation pioneer
- N. D. Cocea, lawyer, writer, journalist, publicist, and politician
- Florin Condurățeanu, journalist
- George Constantin, actor
- Corneliu Coposu, politician and founder of the Christian Democratic National Peasants' Party
- Nicolae Corjos, director
- Pavel Coruț, writer
- George Coșbuc, poet, literary critic, and translator
- Gheorghe Cozorici, actor
- Constantin Cristescu, general
- Sergiu Cunescu, politician

=== D ===
- Daniel Danielopolu, physician and academic
- Hariclea Darclée, soprano
- Alexandru Darie, theater director
- Mihail Davidoglu, playwright
- Gheorghe Gheorghiu-Dej, President of the State Council
- Anghel Demetriescu, historian and writer
- Ovid Densusianu, philologist, linguist, folklorist, literary historian and poet
- Dan Deșliu, poet
- Ion Diaconescu, politician and anticommunist activist
- Gheorghe Dinică, actor
- Puși Dinulescu, playwright
- Neagu Djuvara, historian
- Ion Dobran, pilot
- Ștefan Augustin Doinaș, poet
- Ion Dolănescu, singer
- Felicia Donceanu, composer
- Corneliu Dragalina, general
- Ion Dragalina, general
- Mihai Drăgănescu, engineer

=== E ===
- Lucia Efrim, journalist
- Victor Eftimiu, poet and playwright
- Mihai Eminescu, poet, writer, and journalist
- Paul Everac, playwright

=== F ===
- Grigore Filipescu, politician, journalist, and engineer
- Eugen Filotti, diplomat, publicist, and writer
- Ion Finteșteanu, stage and film actor
- Mihai Fotino, actor

=== G ===
- Radu Gabrea, film director and screenwriter
- Vladimir Găitan, actor
- Emil Gârleanu, writer, director, scenarist, and journalist
- Nicholas Georgescu-Roegen, mathematician, statistician, teacher, and economist
- Evlogi and Hristo Georgiev, businessmen and philanthropists
- Valentin Gheorghiu, classical pianist and composer
- Dimitrie Ghica, Prime Minister
- Dinu C. Giurescu, historian
- Constantin C. Giurescu, historian
- Radu Greceanu, chronicler
- Radu Grigorovici, physicist

=== H ===
- Pompeiu Hărășteanu, operatic bass
- Spiru Haret, mathematician, astronomer, and teacher
- Iulia Hasdeu, poet
- Ignacio Hidalgo de Cisneros, Spanish military aviator (in 1994 his remains moved to Spain)
- Nicolae Hortolomei, surgeon
- Emil Hossu, actor
- Iuliu Hossu, bishop, political prisoner and cardinal
- Dragomir Hurmuzescu, physicist and academic

=== I ===
- Alexandru Ionescu, socialist militant
- Nae Ionescu, philosopher, logician, teacher, and journalist
- Șerban Ionescu, actor
- Iorgu Iordan, linguist, philologist, and communist politician
- Nicolae Iorga, historian, literary critic, librarian, playwright, poet, encyclopedist, memoirist and Prime Minister of Romania
- Antonie Iorgovan, jurist, professor, and politician
- Ștefan Octavian Iosif, poet and translator
- Petre Ispirescu, editor, folklorist, storyteller, writer and typographer
- Constantin Istrati, chemist, president of the Romanian Academy
- Panait Istrati, writer

=== K ===
- Ioan Kalinderu, jurist, president of the Romanian Academy
- Alexandru Kirițescu, playwright
- Nicolae Kretzulescu, physician and Prime Minister of Romania

=== L ===
- Nicolae Labiș, poet
- Iacob Lahovary, general and politician
- Constantin Lecca, painter and drawing teacher
- Mircea Lucescu, football player and manager
- Ștefan Luchian, painter

=== M ===
- Alexandru Macedonski, poet, writer, playwright, and publicist
- George Magheru, poet and playwright
- Titu Maiorescu, lawyer, writer, philosopher, founder of Junimea, and Prime Minister of Romania
- Mircea Malița, mathematician, diplomat, essayist
- Viorel Mărginean, painter
- Manea Mănescu, Prime Minister
- Radu Manicatide, engineer and aircraft constructor
- Lia Manoliu, Olympic athlete
- Ștefania Mărăcineanu, physicist
- Gabriel Marinescu, general and politician
- Cornel Medrea, sculptor
- Ioan Luchian Mihalea, composer, conductor, and television host
- Matei Millo, actor
- Mina Minovici, forensic scientist
- Ion Minulescu, poet and writer
- Angela Moldovan, singer
- Ovidiu Iuliu Moldovan, actor
- Traian Moșoiu, general
- Mircea Mureșan, film director
- Tudor Mușatescu, poet, writer, playwright, and humorist

=== N ===
- Gellu Naum, poet, writer, and translator
- Mircea Nedelciu, writer
- Costin Nenițescu, chemist and academic

=== O ===
- Alexandru Odobescu, writer, archaeologist and politician

=== P ===
- Dimitrie Paciurea, sculptor
- Zenovie Pâclișanu, historian, diplomat, and cleric
- Alexandru Paleologu, essayist, literary critic, diplomat, and politician
- Theodor Pallady, painter
- Gherman Pântea, soldier and politician
- Hortensia Papadat-Bengescu, writer and novelist
- Anca Parghel, jazz singer and teacher
- Vasile Pârvan, historian and archaeologist
- Dinu Patriciu, billionaire businessman and politician
- Cristian Pațurcă, composer
- Ivan Patzaichin, canoeist
- Adrian Păunescu, writer, literary critic, essayist, poet, publicist, translator, and politician
- Amza Pellea, actor
- Milița Petrașcu, portrait artist and sculptor
- Camil Petrescu, novelist, playwright, philosopher and poet
- Cezar Petrescu, novelist, translator and journalist
- Gică Petrescu, singer and composer
- Adrian Pintea, actor
- Lucian Pintilie, theatre, film, and opera director
- Florian Pittiș, actor, director, translator, and folk singer
- Dumitru Radu Popescu, novelist, poet, dramatist, and short story writer
- Mitică Popescu, actor
- N. Porsenna, poet, novelist, and politician
- David Praporgescu, general
- Marin Preda, academician, novelist, writer and communist deputy in the Great National Assembly
- George Pruteanu, literary critic and politician

=== R ===
- Elie Radu, civil engineer and academic
- Ioana Radu, singer
- Dem Rădulescu, actor and professor
- Constantin Rădulescu-Motru, philosopher, psychologist, teacher, politician, playwright and theater director
- Colea Răutu, actor
- Liviu Rebreanu, writer and playwright
- C. A. Rosetti, politician, publicist, and leader of the Wallachian Revolution of 1848
- Radu R. Rosetti, general, military historian, and librarian
- Theodor Rosetti, Prime Minister

=== S ===
- Ion Marin Sadoveanu, playwright
- Mihail Sadoveanu, writer, storyteller, novelist, academician, and politician
- Constantin Sănătescu, general and Prime Minister of Romania
- Eugen Simion, literary critic, historian, and academician
- Anastase Simu, art collector
- Ion N. Socolescu, architect
- Toma Barbu Socolescu, architect
- Toma N. Socolescu, architect
- Toma T. Socolescu, architect
- Dan Spătaru, singer
- Cristina Stamate, actress
- Zaharia Stancu, writer, poet, novelist, theater director, journalist, and publicist
- Silviu Stănculescu, actor
- Nichita Stănescu, poet, writer, essayist
- Tatiana Stepa, folk singer
- Valeriu Sterian, musician, singer and composer
- Laura Stoica, singer, composer and actress

=== T ===
- Constantin Tănase, actor
- Maria Tănase, singer
- Nicolae Șerban Tanașoca, historian and philologist
- Octavian Codru Tăslăuanu, magazine publisher and politician
- Ionel Teodoreanu, novelist and lawyer
- Dumitru Topciu, politician and agriculturalist
- Gheorghe Țițeica, mathematician
- Șerban Țițeica, quantum physicist

=== U ===
- Mihaela Ursuleasa, pianist

=== V ===
- Radu Vasile, historian and Prime Minister of Romania
- Grigore Vasiliu Birlic, actor
- Iancu Văcărescu, poet
- Iulian Vesper, poet and prose writer
- Tudor Vianu, esthetician, literary critic and historian, poet, essayist, philosopher, and translator
- Aurel Vlaicu, engineer, inventor, and aviation pioneer
- Alexandru Vlahuță, writer
- Alice Voinescu, writer, academic, translator
- Gheorghe Vrănceanu, mathematician
- Traian Vuia, inventor and aviation pioneer

=== X ===
- A. D. Xenopol, academician, historian, philosopher, economist, teacher, sociologist, and writer

=== Z ===
- Constantin Zablovschi, engineer
- Camelia Zorlescu, actress

== Gallery ==
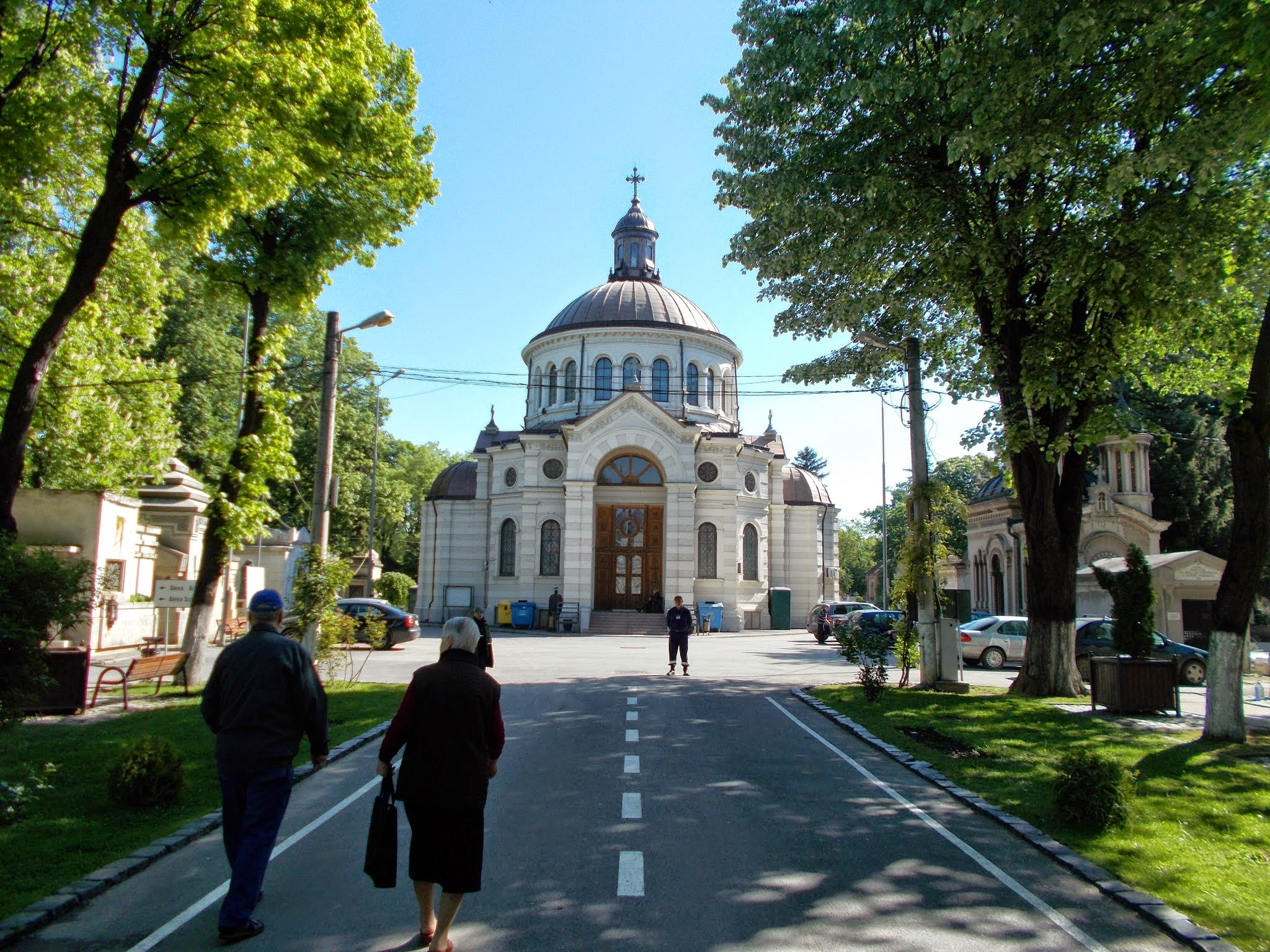

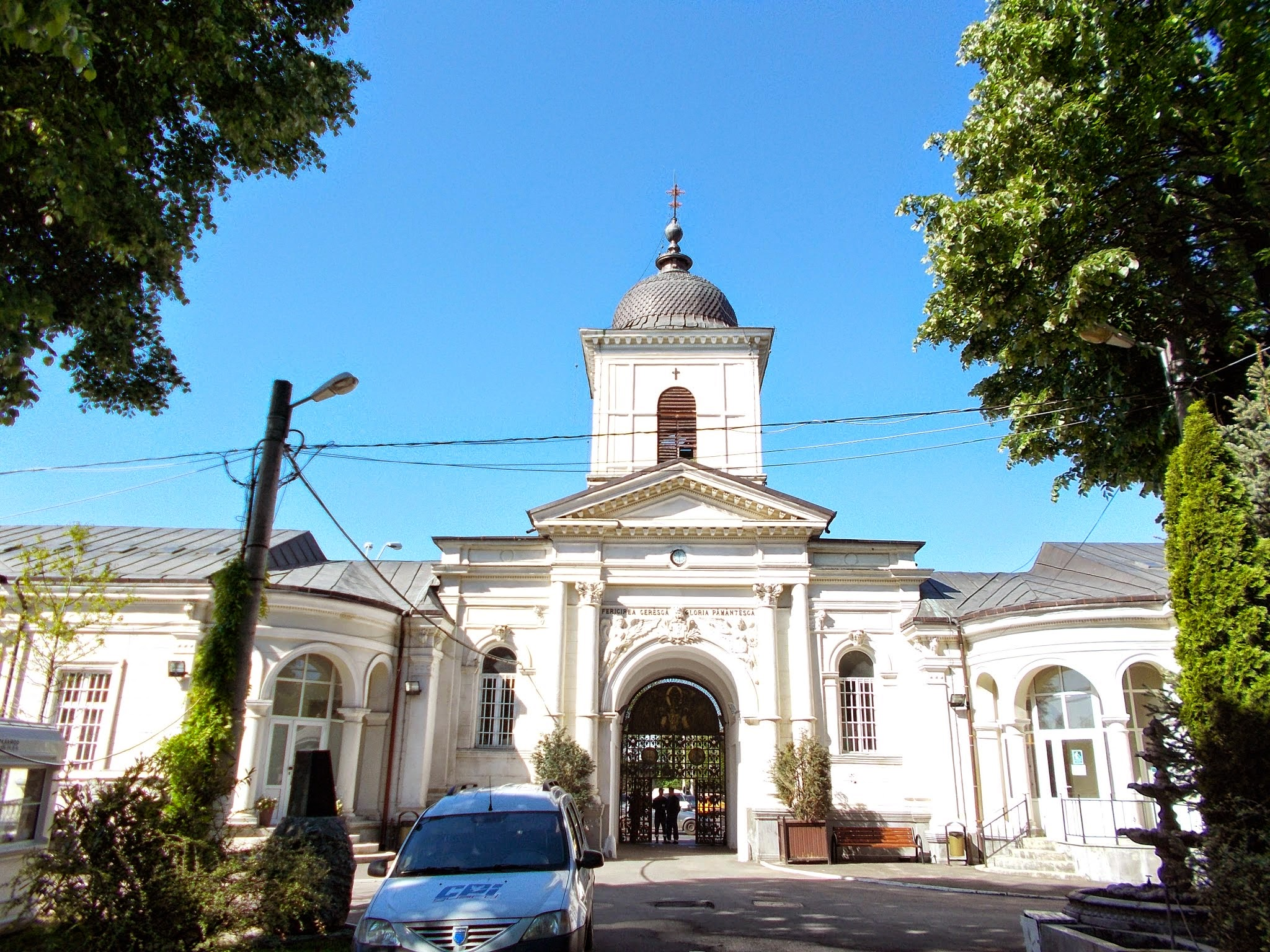

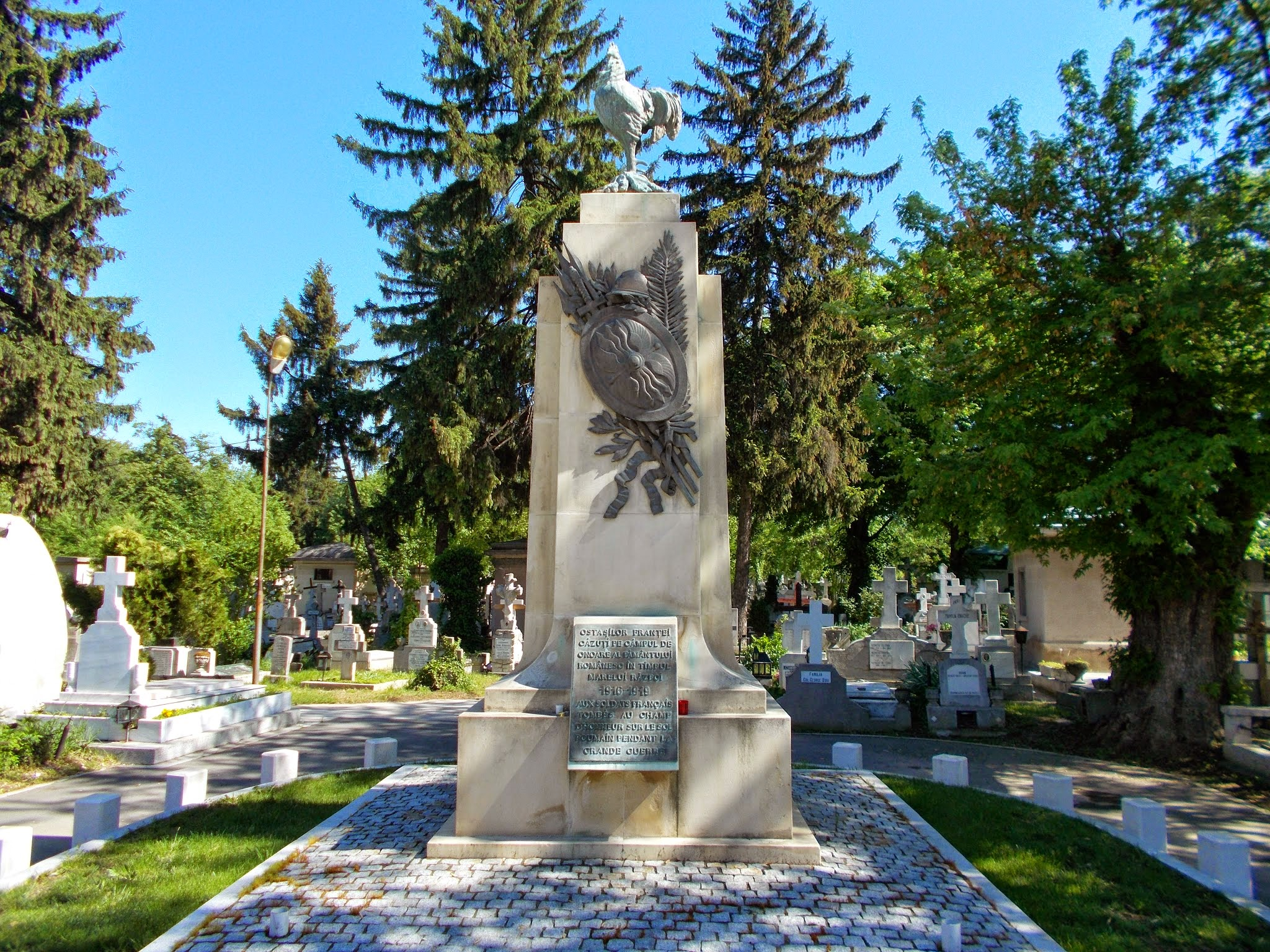

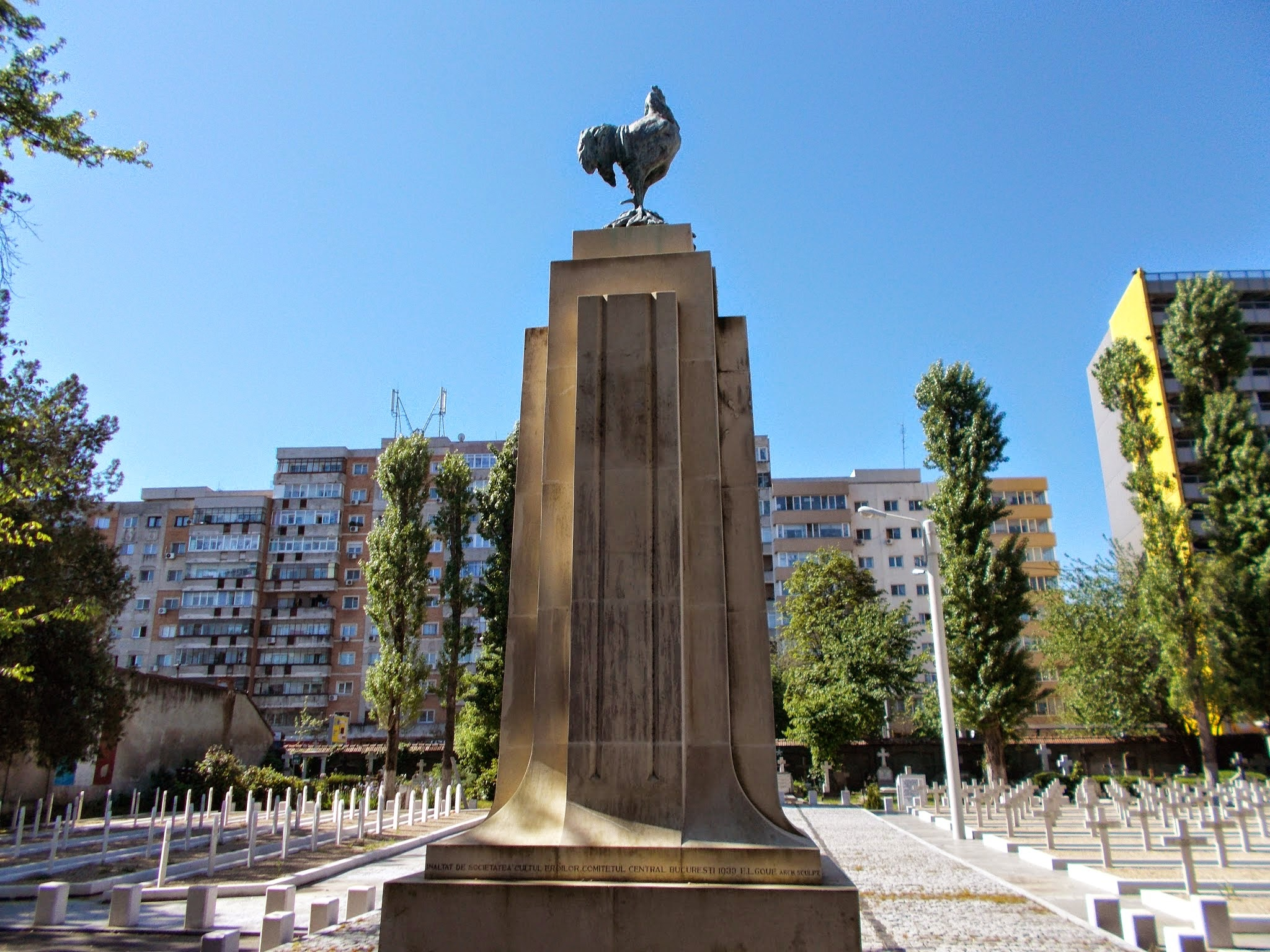

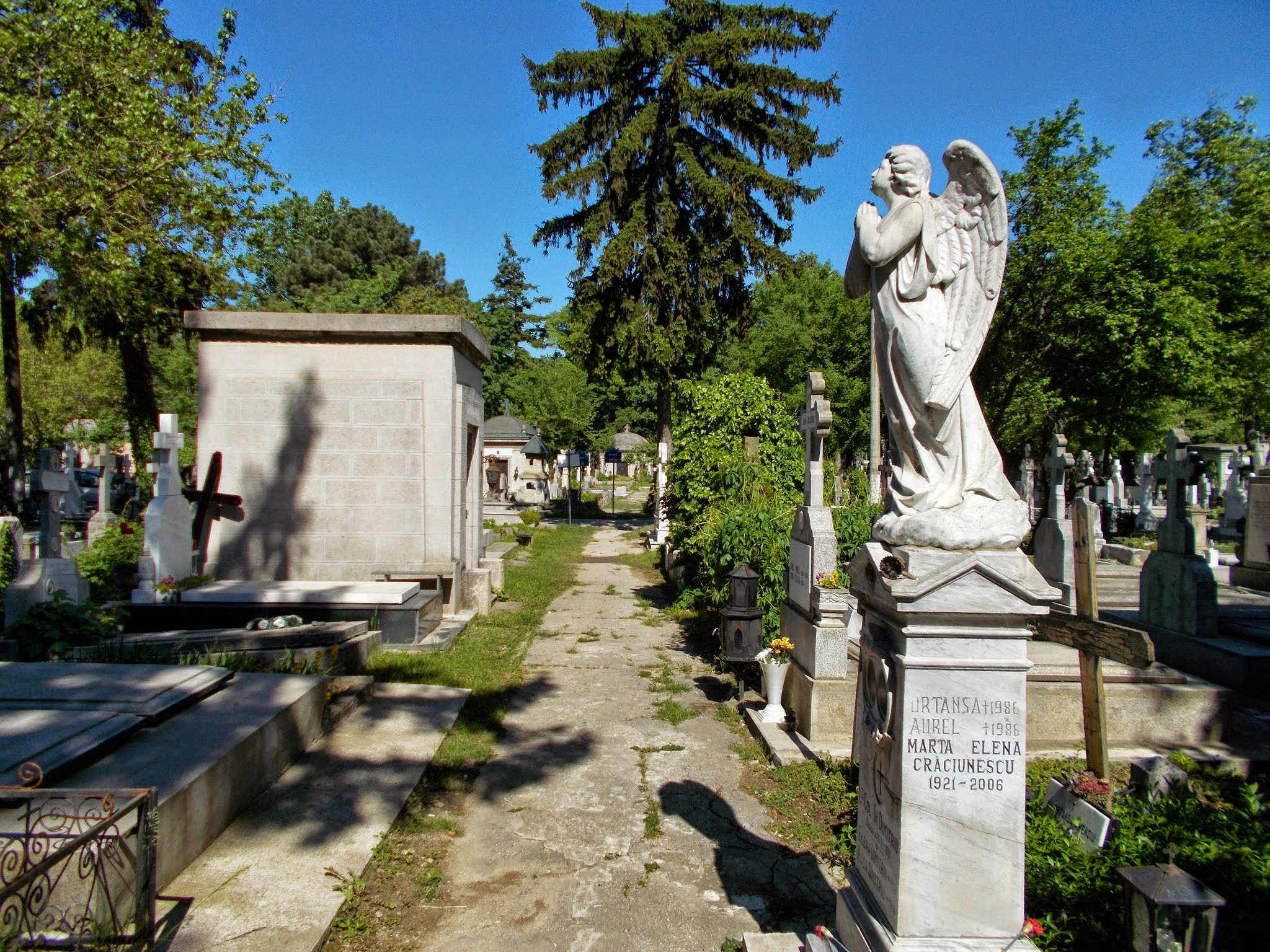

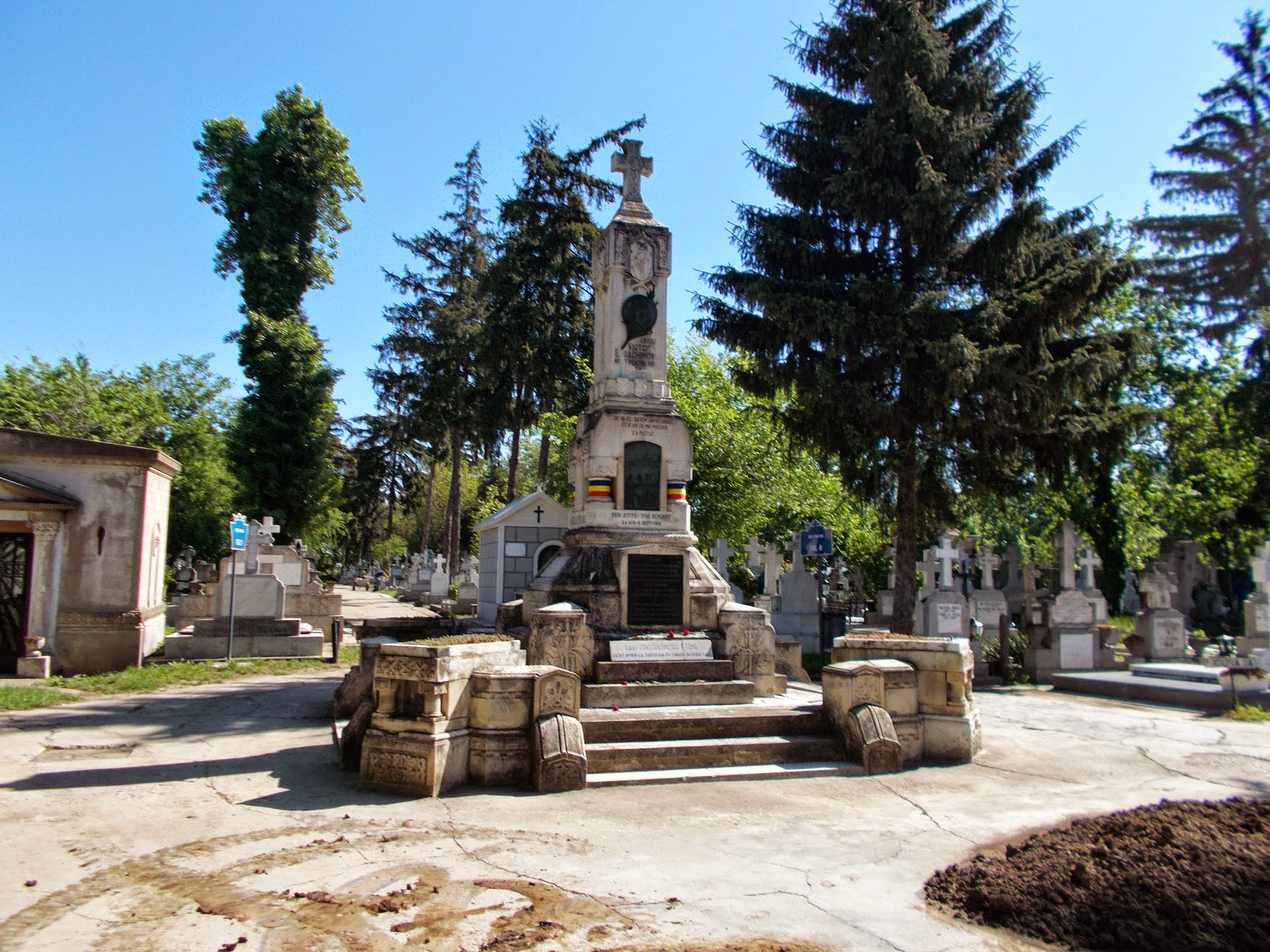

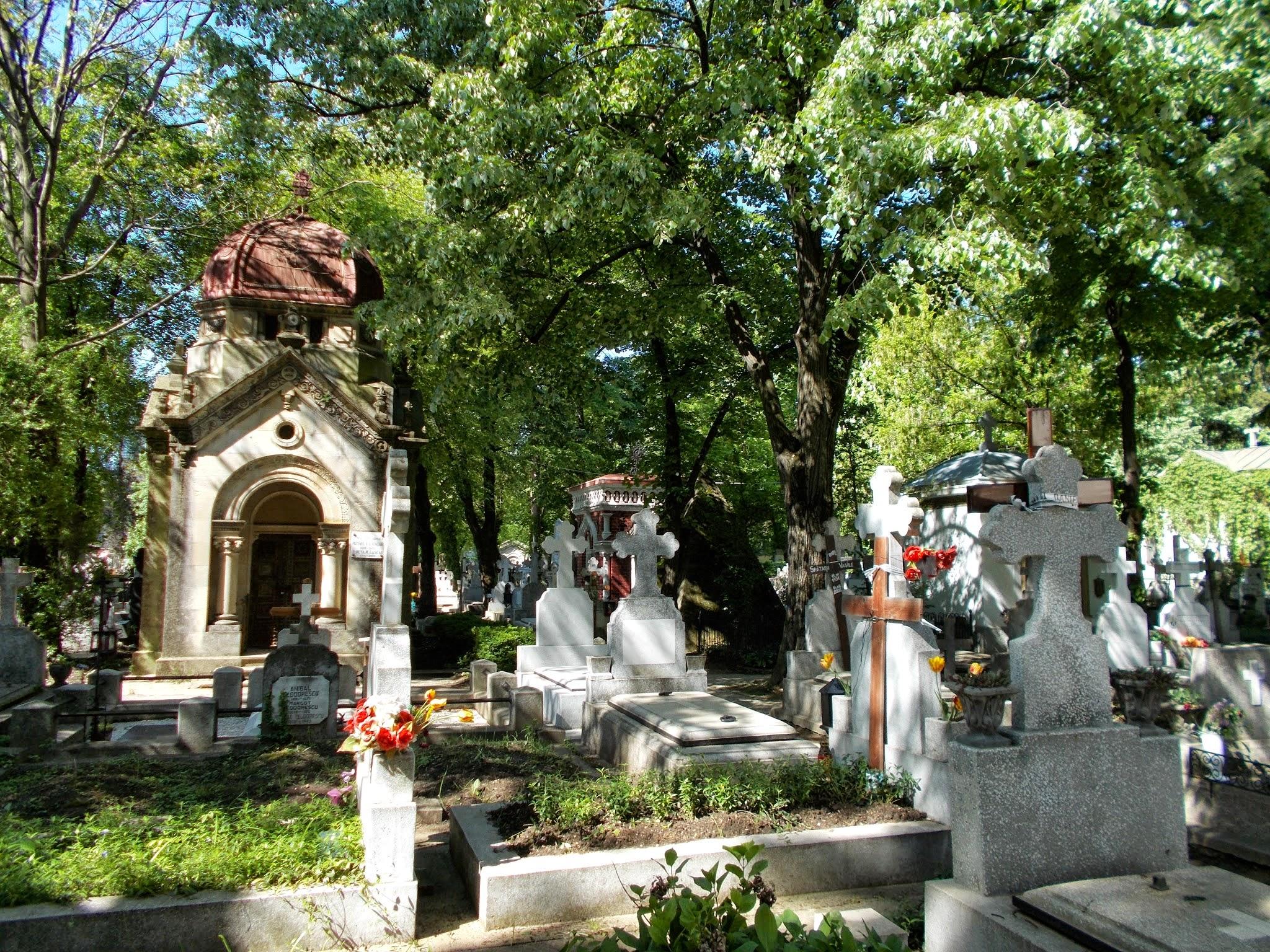

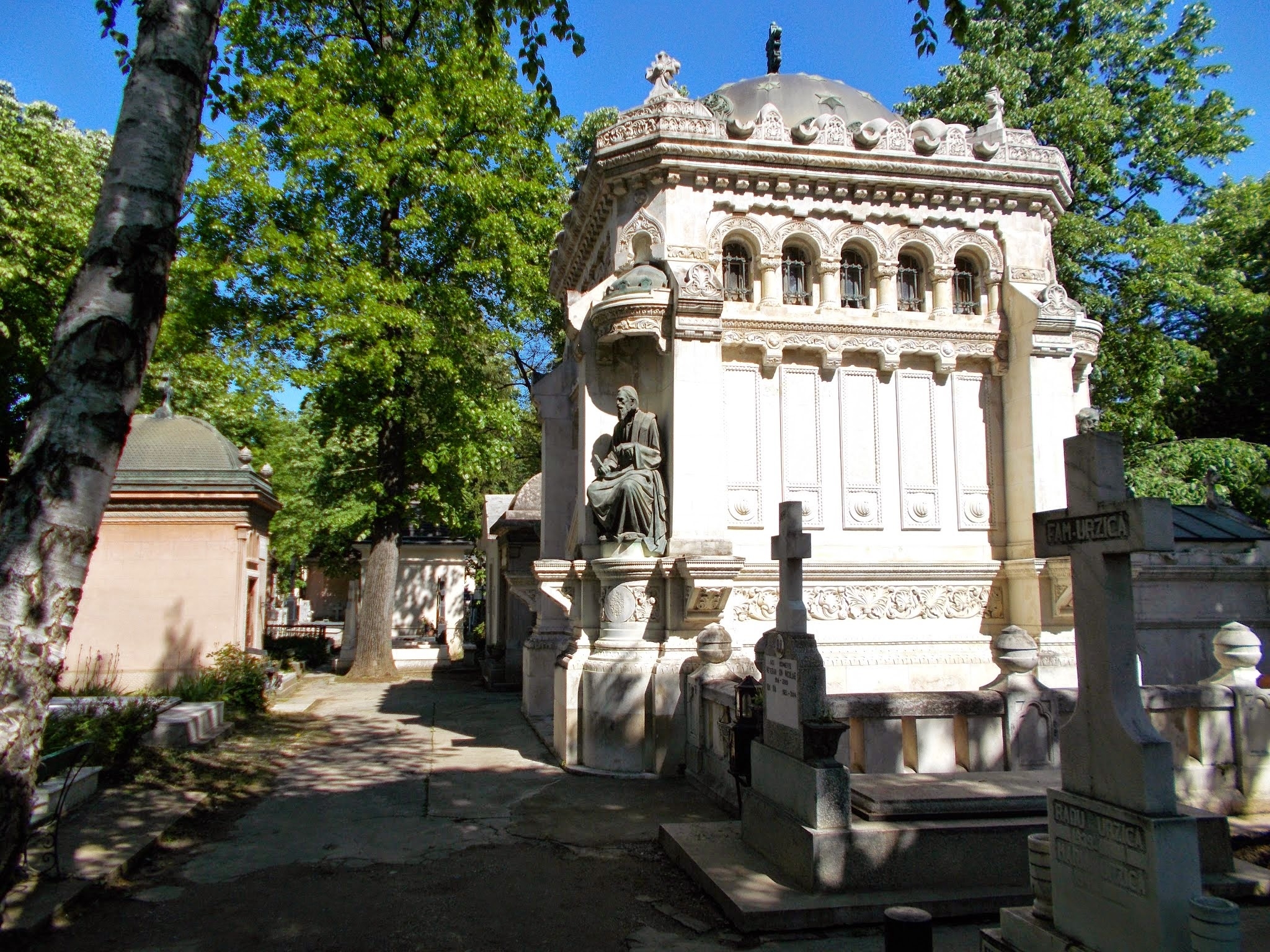

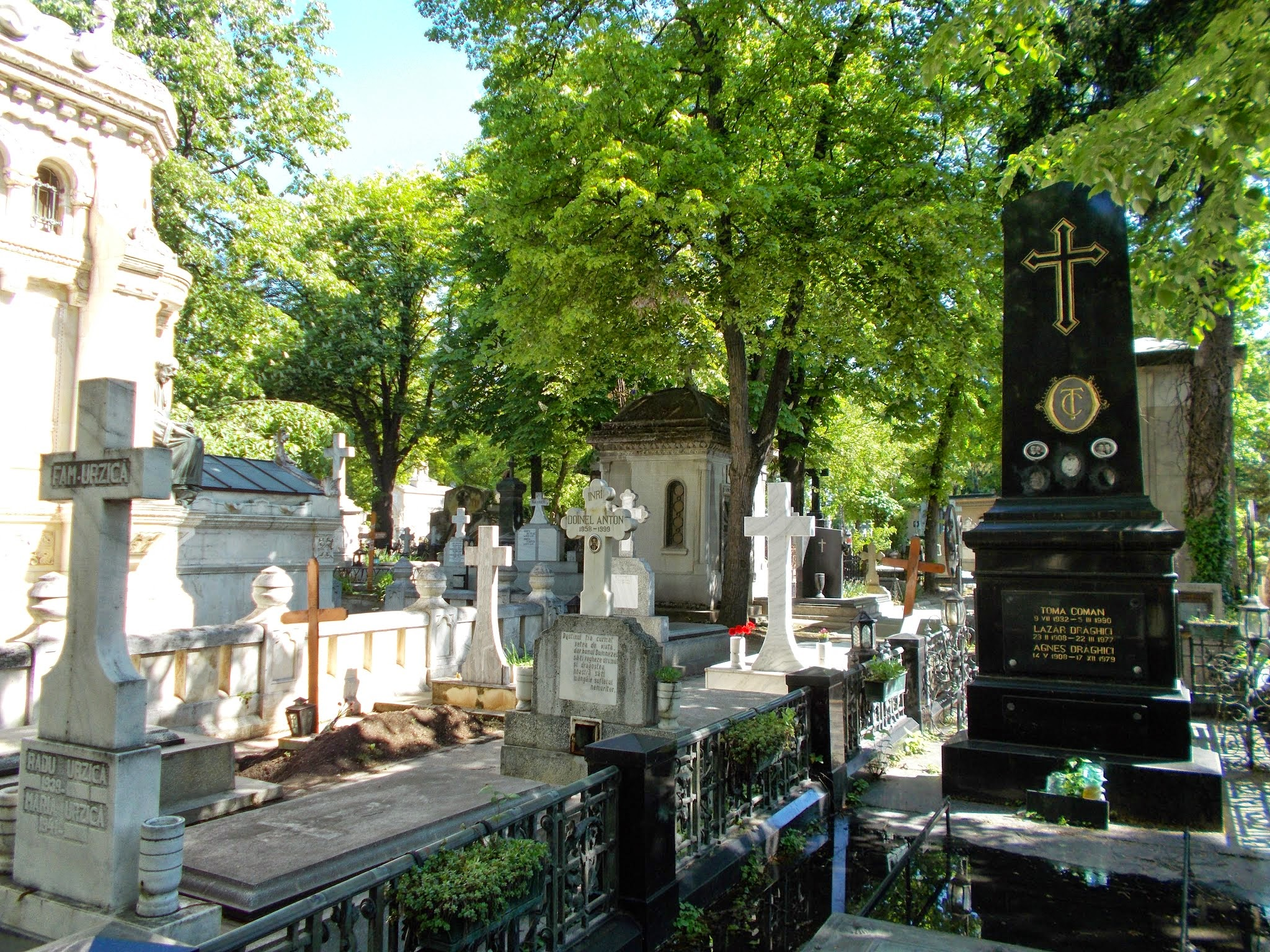

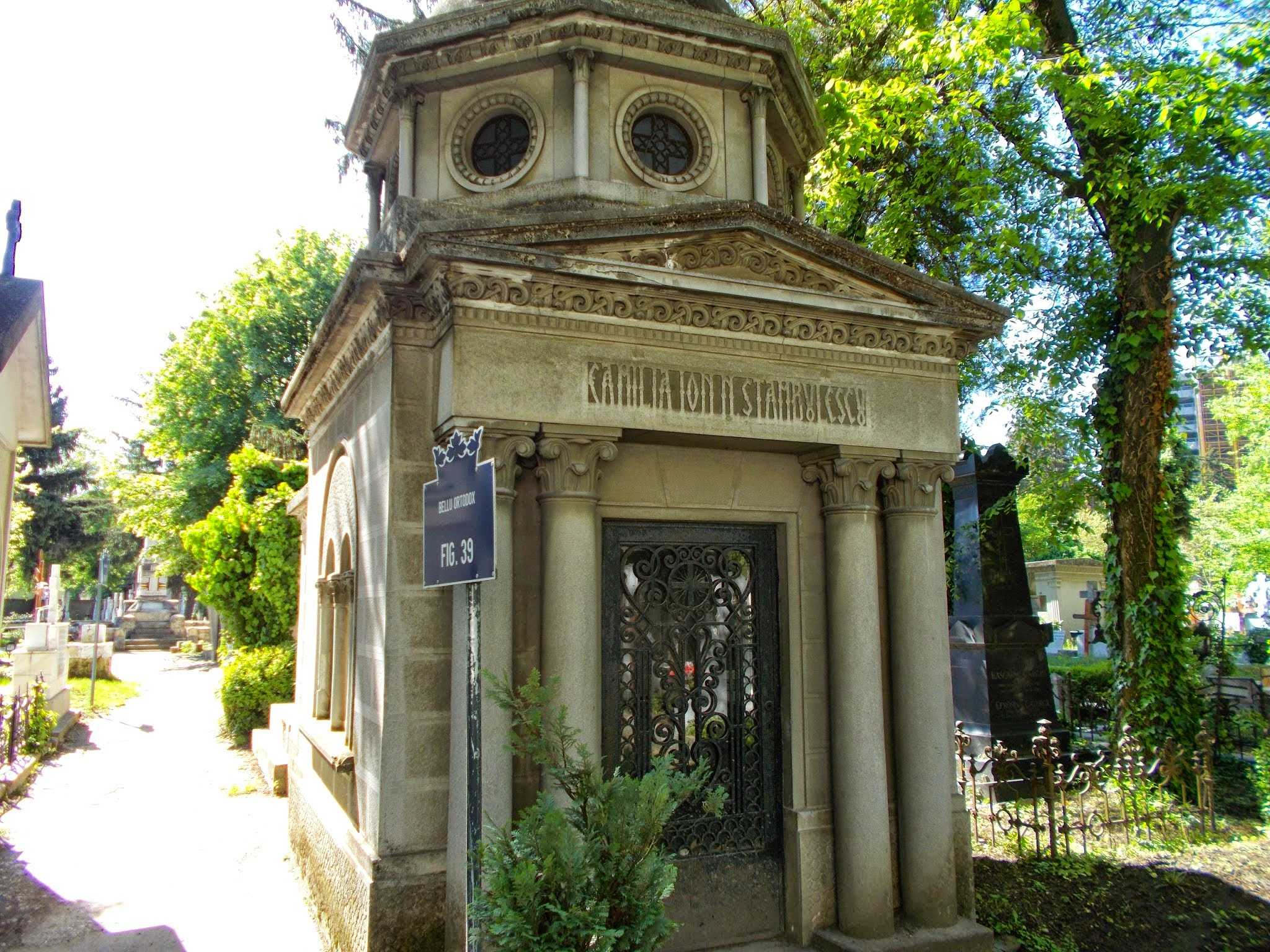

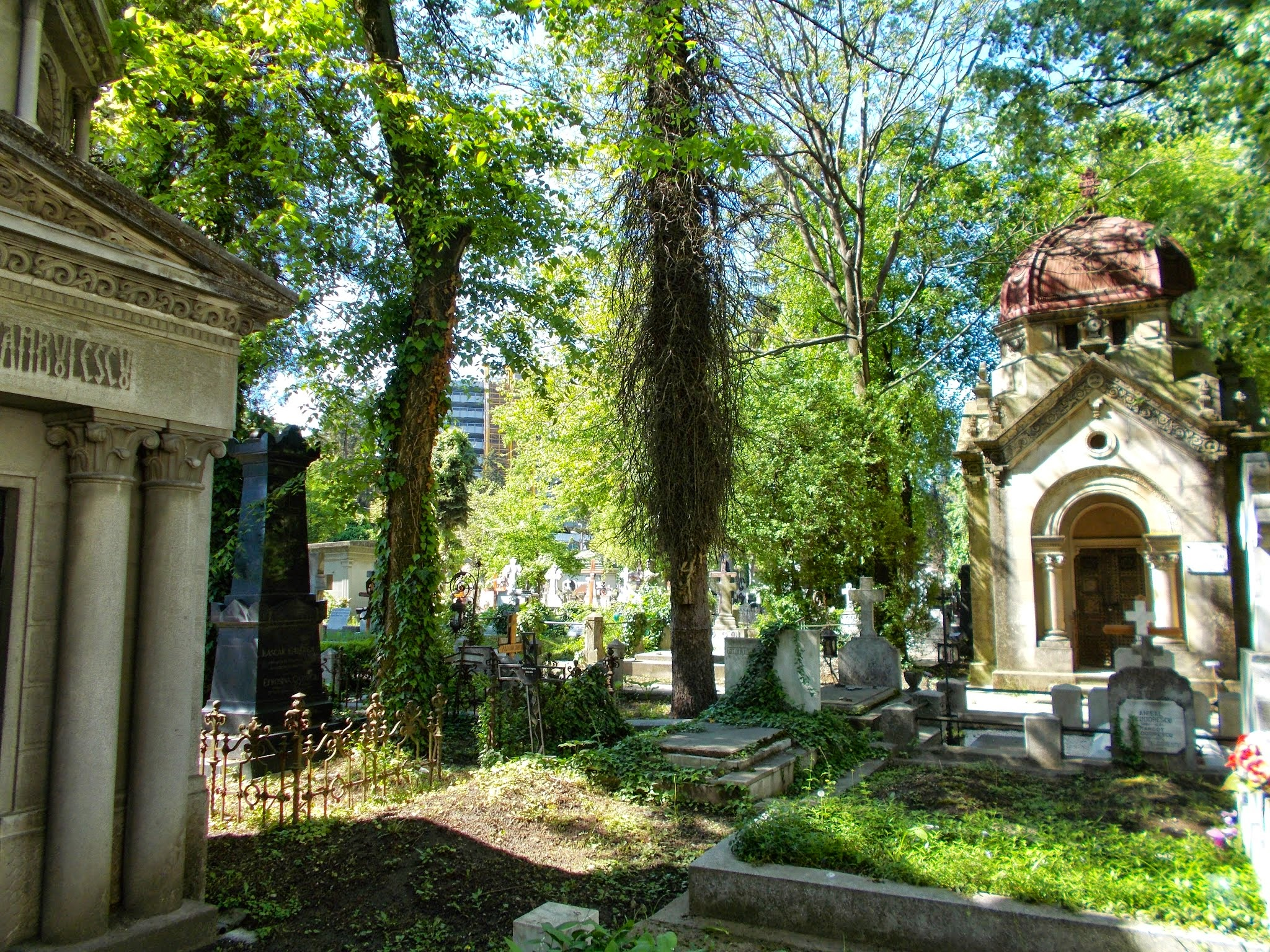

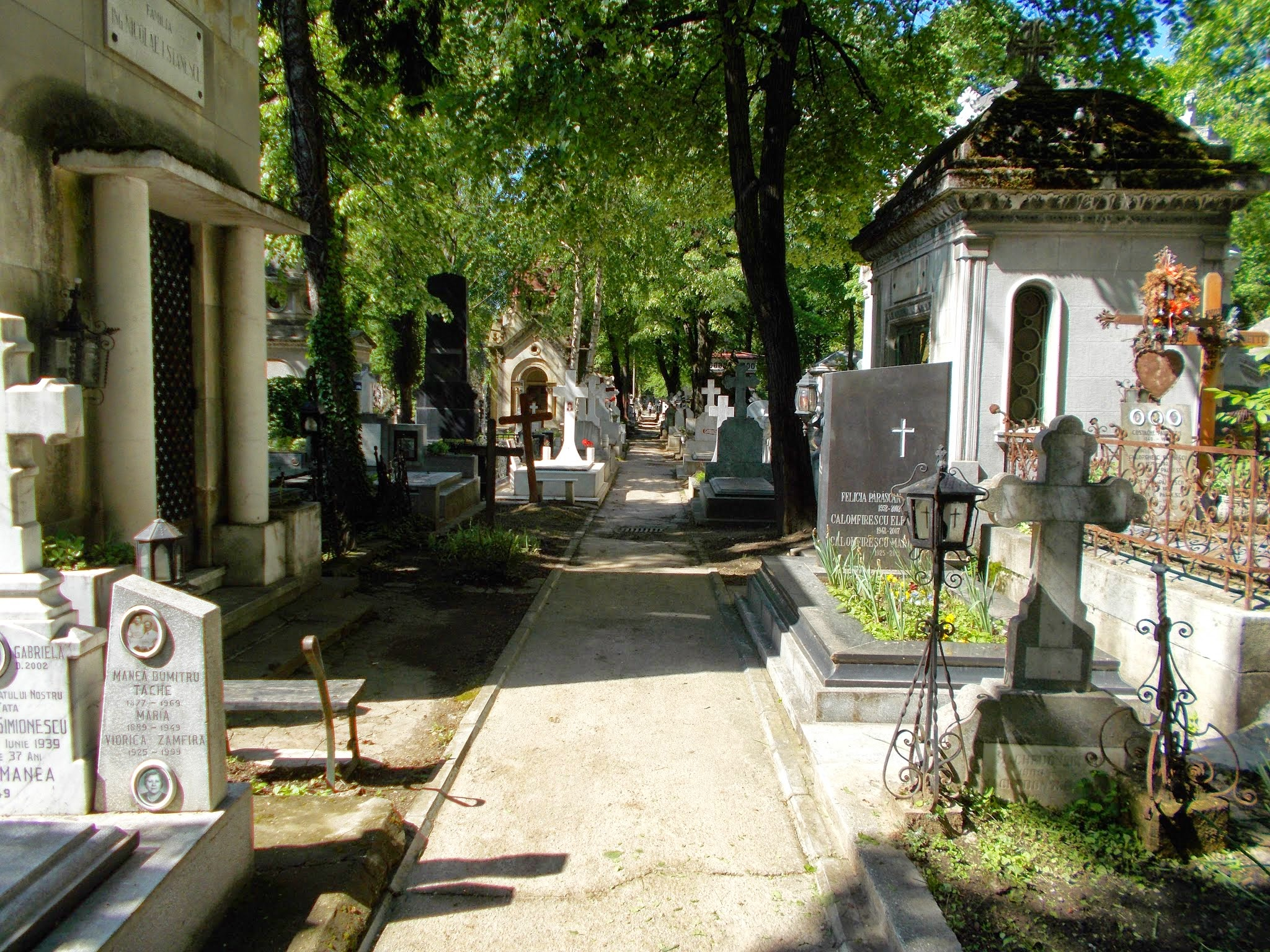

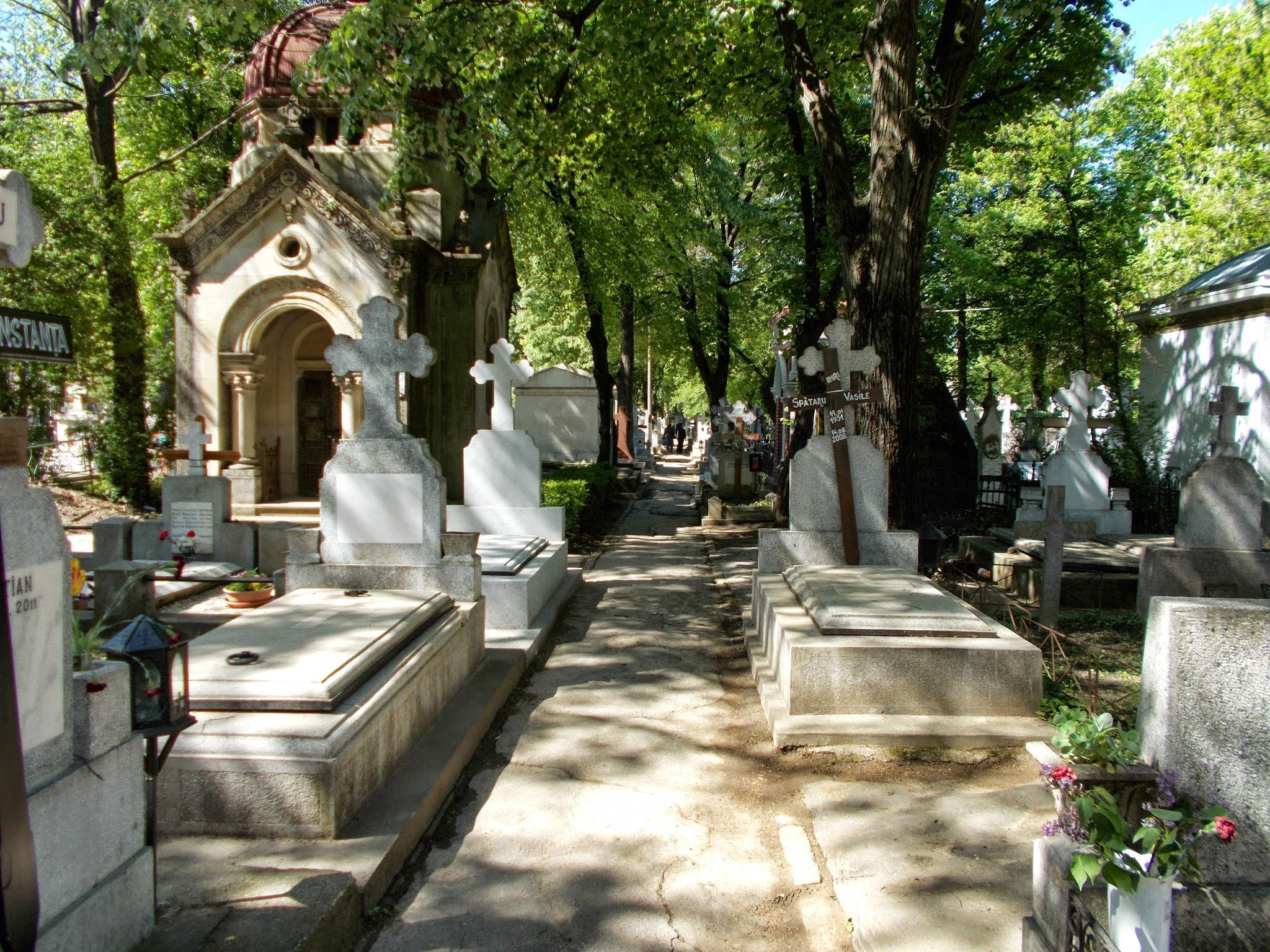

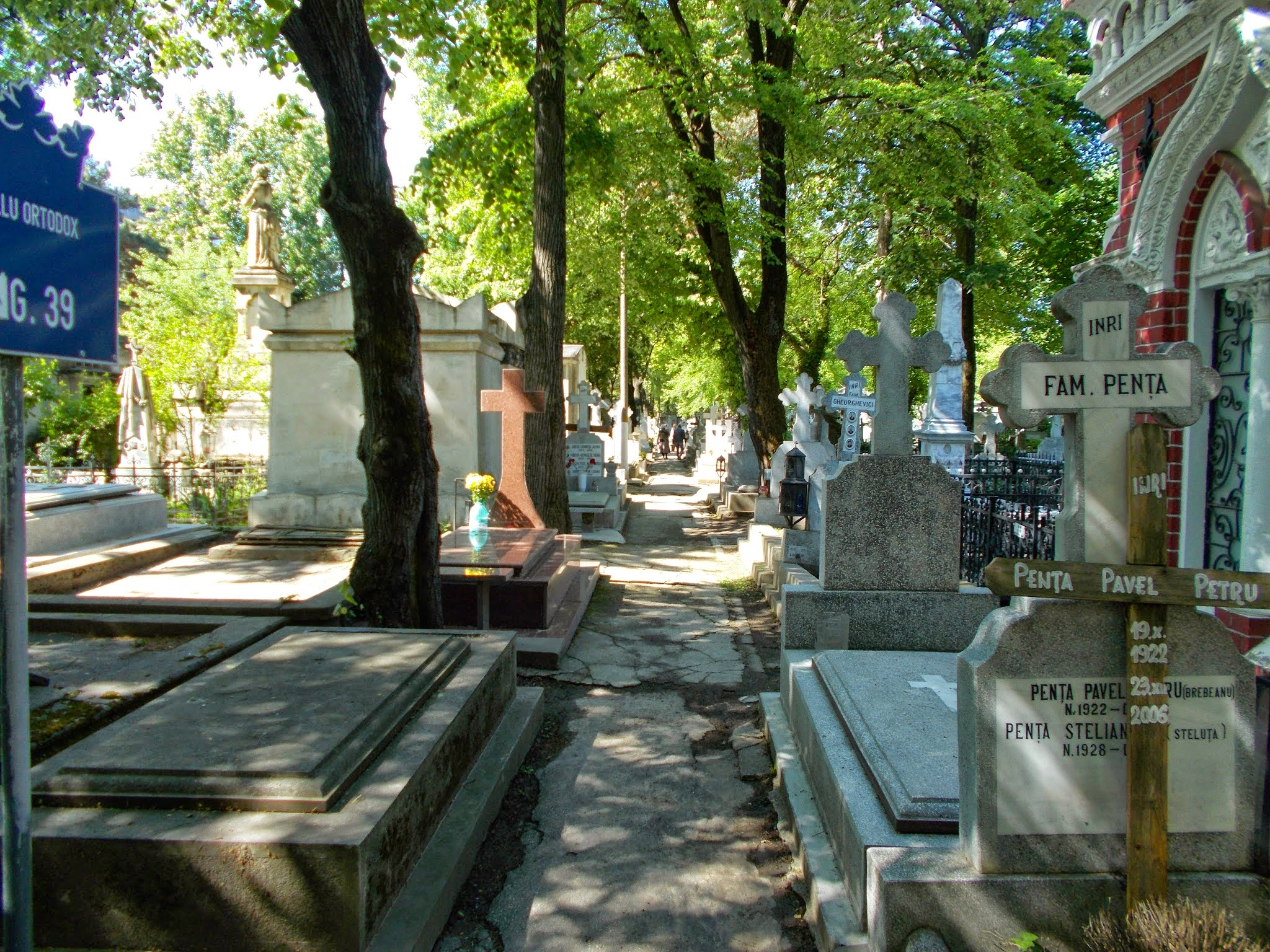

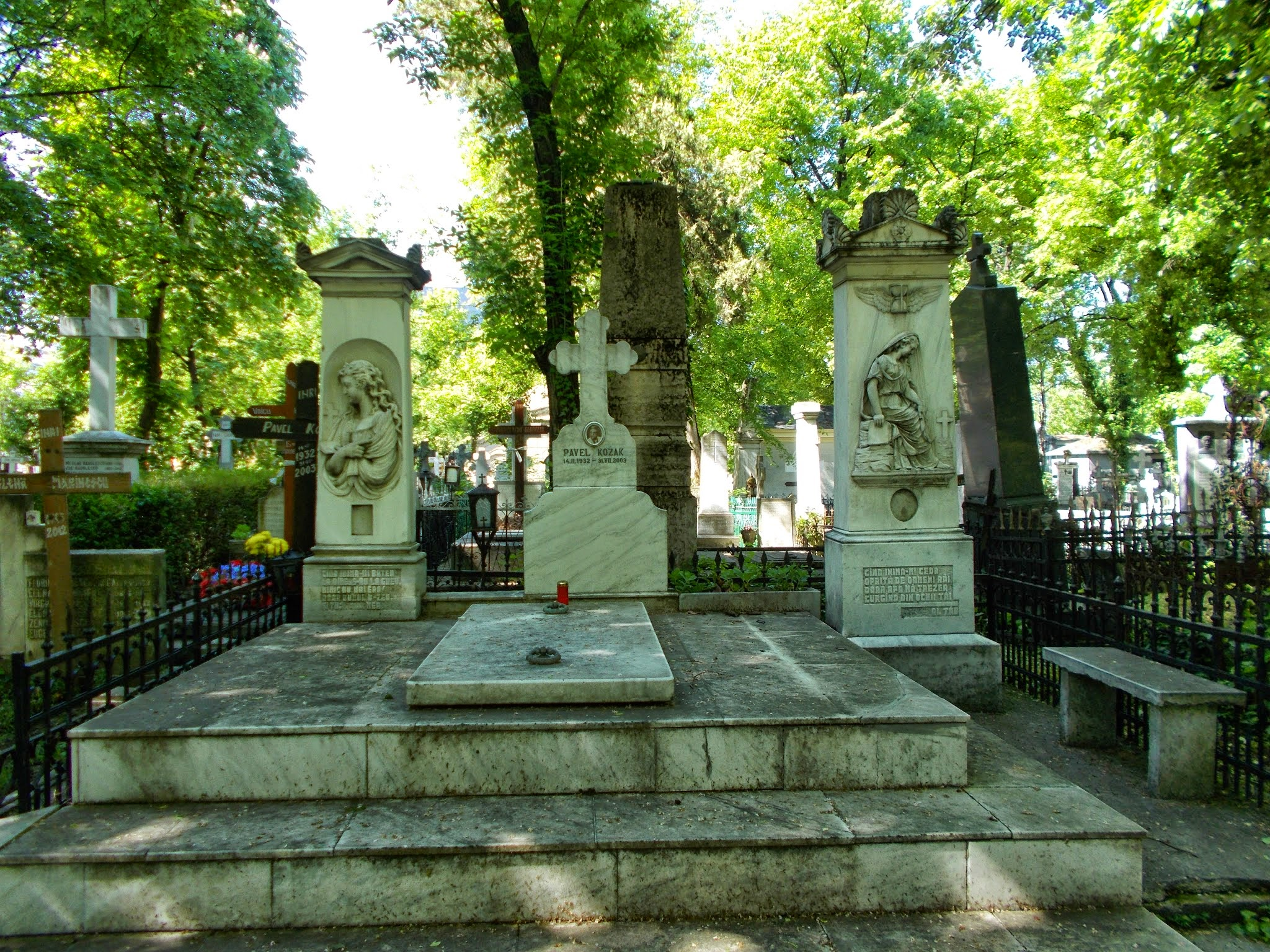

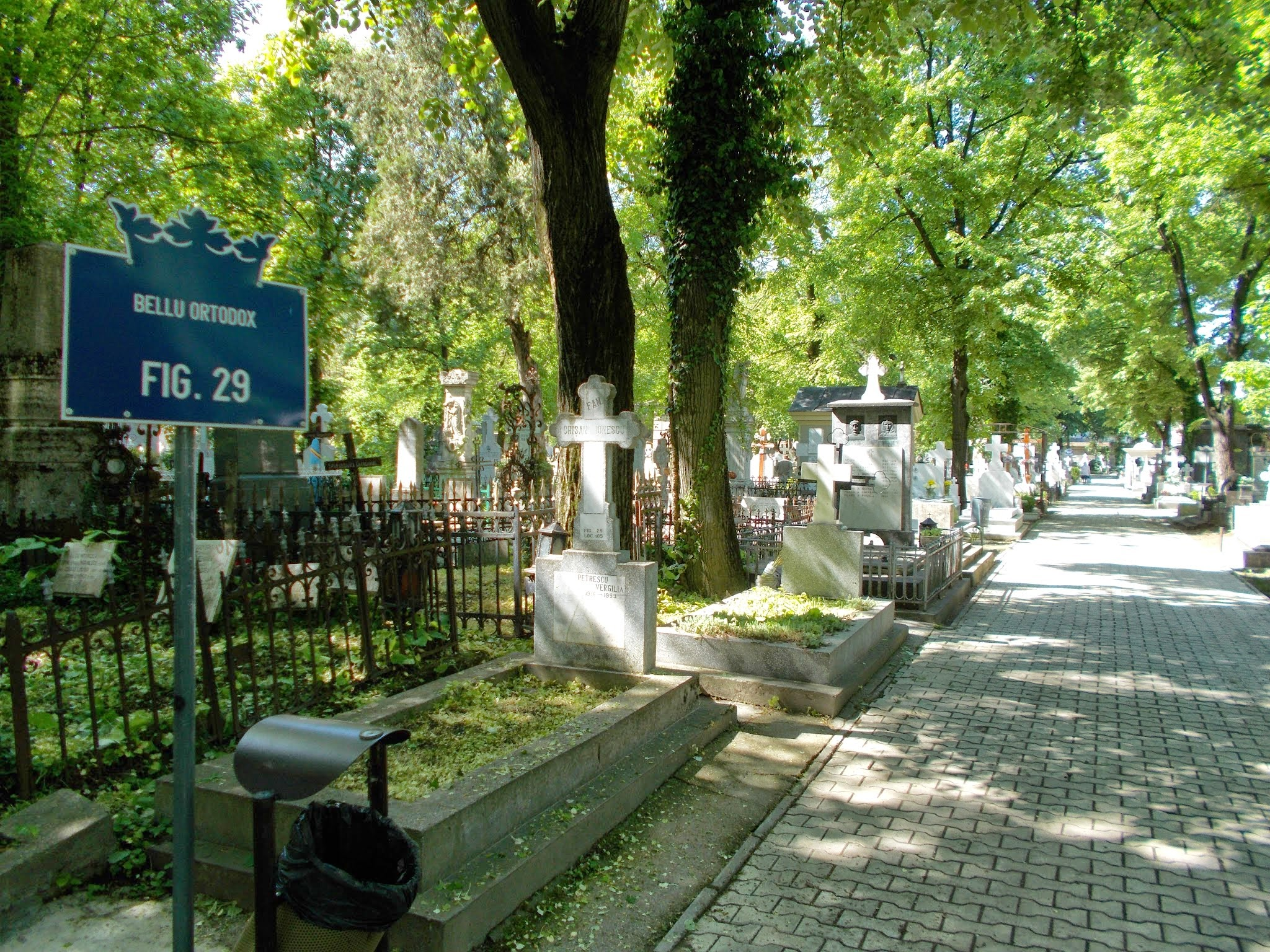

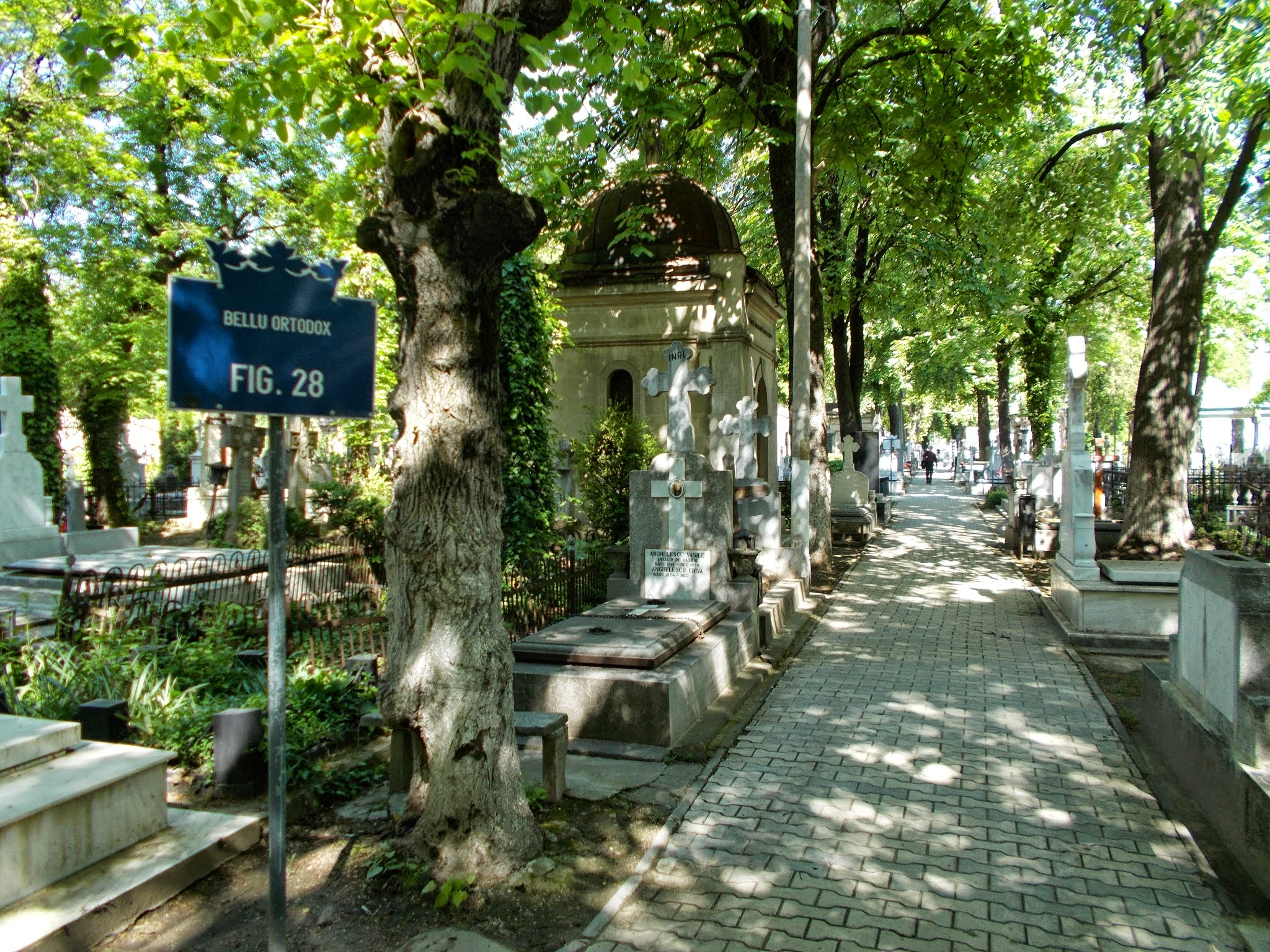
