= Dodd–Bullough–Mikhailov equation =

The Dodd–Bullough–Mikhailov equation is a nonlinear partial differential equation introduced by Roger Dodd, Robin Bullough, and Alexander Mikhailov.

$$u_{xt}+\alpha*e^u+\gamma*e^{-2*u} = 0.$$

In 2005, mathematician Abdul-Majid Wazwaz combined the Tzitzeica equation with Dodd–Bullough–Mikhailov equation into the Tzitz´eica–Dodd–Bullough–Mikhailov equation.

The Dodd–Bullough–Mikhailov equation has traveling wave solutions.
