= Robin Bullough =

British mathematical physicist (1929–2008)

- Prof Robin Bullough, as illustrated in a portrait that hung in the Mathematics Dept common room of the Maths and Social Sciences Building to commemorate Bullough's term as head of department.
- Born: 21 November 1929
- Died: 30 August 2008 (aged 78)
- Known for: Bullough-Dodd model Dodd-Bullough-Mikhailov equation Bullough-Dodd-Zhiber-Shabat equation (with Roger Dodd, Anatoly Zhiber, and Aleksei Shabat); Tzitzéica-Bullough-Dodd equation

Robin K. Bullough (21 November 1929 – 30 August 2008) was a British mathematical physicist known for his contributions to the theory of solitons, in particular for his role in the development of the theory of the optical soliton, now commonly used, for example, in the theory of trans-oceanic optical fibre communication theory, but first recognised in Bullough's work on ultra-short (nano- and femto-second) optical pulses. He is also known for deriving exact solutions to the nonlinear equations describing these solitons and for associated work on integrable systems, infinite-dimensional Hamiltonian systems (both classical and quantum), and the statistical mechanics for these systems. Bullough also contributed to nonlinear mathematical physics, including Bose–Einstein condensation in magnetic traps.

Bullough obtained his first academic position in the Mathematics Department at UMIST in 1960 and was appointed chair of Mathematical Physics in 1973 where he remained until his retirement in 1995. He was then an emeritus Professor in the same department, which has now become the School of Mathematics in the University of Manchester.

== Education and career ==
Bullough's father, William Bullough, was a teacher of German in Newcastle-under-Lyme and was himself a graduate of the Victoria University of Manchester. His mother Edith (née Norman) was also a teacher and both parents were Quakers.

Although universally known as Robin, he was actually christened Robert Keith Bullough. Both Robin and his elder brother Donald attended Newcastle High School (then a direct grant grammar school). Donald went on to become a successful professor of medieval history.

On leaving school at 16, Bullough obtained a scholarship to Emmanuel College, Cambridge but had to do National Service in the RAF in 1948 and 1949. Three days before his demobilisation he had an accident, putting a rawl plug into a wall, as a piece of steel from a chisel flew into his left eye. He was practically blind in that eye from then on. He obtained a BA in Natural Sciences at Cambridge, specialising in Theoretical Physics for Part II. He went on to obtain a PhD in Chemistry from the University of Leeds in 1957.

He then obtained a job as a Mathematical Physicist at the British Rayon Research Association in Manchester between 1959 and 1960 before obtaining a post as lecturer at UMIST. Bullough travelled widely to facilitate collaboration, with regular visiting appointments and research visits to Copenhagen, Jyväskylä, Los Alamos, DTH Lyngby in Denmark, and Ben Gurion University in Israel.

He was promoted to Reader in 1967 and Professor of Mathematical Physics in 1973.

He organised many conferences over his career including the first National Quantum Electronics Conferences (QEP1) in Manchester in September 1973 and at which he made a first report of 'optical solitons', this was the first of fifteen biennial meetings.

By 1973 his research group in UMIST had found solutions to the sine-Gordon and the self-induced transparency (SIT) equations for their multi-soliton solutions and gone on to both introduce, and to solve the initial value problem for, the system they called the ‘Reduced Maxwell-Bloch (RMB) Equations’.

Bullough supervised 24 successful doctoral students and had some 33 post doctoral research associates and visiting fellows.

In 1999 he gave the specially invited 'Special Foundation Lecture' at the Fourteenth UK National Quantum Electronics & Photonics Conference (QEP14) held at the University of Manchester. The lecture was entitled "The optical soliton of QE1 is the BEC of QE14: has the quantum soliton arrived?" paid tribute to his 45 years work in this area. This work in theoretical quantum optics includes the discovery of the "optical soliton" as such around 1973. Only Steven Chu, Nobel Laureate 1997, was similarly honoured at this conference.

Bullough died on 30 August 2008. A symposium was organised in his honour in the Alan Turing Building in June 2009.

== Bibliography ==
Bullough published over 200 scientific papers with a range of co-authors. Some of the most highly cited are:

- Puri RR, Bullough RK, Quantum electrodynamics of an atom making 2-photon transitions in an ideal cavity, Journal of the Optical Society of America B-optical physics, 5 (10), 2021–2028, 1988
- Dodd RK, Bullough RK, Polynomial conserved densities for sine-Gordon equations Proceedings of the Royal Society of London series A—Mathematical Physical and Engineering Sciences 352 (1671): 481-503 1977
- Eilbeck JC, Gibbon JD, Caudrey PJ, Bullough RK. Solitons in nonlinear optics 1: more accurate description of 2pi pulse in self-induced transparency. Journal of Physics A—Mathematical and general 6 (9): 1337–1347 1973
- Hassan SS, Bullough RK, Theory of dynamical stark effect, Journal of Physics B—atomic molecular and optical physics, 8 (9): l147-l152 1975
- Caudrey PJ, Gibbon JD, Eilbeck JC, Bullough RK. Exact multisolution solutions of self-induced transparency and sine-gordon equations, Physical Review Letters 30 (6): 237-238 1973
- Bullough RK, Jack PM, Kitchenside PW, et al., Solitons in laser physics, Physica Scripta 20 (3–4): 364-381 1979
- Dodd RK, Bullough RK, Backlund transformations for sine-Gordon equations, Proceedings of the Royal Society of London Series A-mathematical physical and engineering sciences 351, (1667): 499-523 1976
