= Lucia Efrim =

Romanian journalist (1968–2025)

- Born: Lucia Margareta Efrim; 2 February 1968; Romania
- Died: 7 August 2025 (aged 57)
- Resting place: Bellu Cemetery, Bucharest, Romania
- Occupation: Journalist

Lucia Margareta Efrim (2 February 1968 – 7 August 2025), also known as Toto, was a Romanian journalist.

== Career ==
Efrim was a journalist with Mediafax. She joined the agency in 1993; she had originally intended to start her career earlier in life, however the 1989 Romanian Revolution created challenges.

During her journalism career, Efrim worked for the Ministry of Labor, and helped Ukrainian refugees in the Russo-Ukrainian war.

== Death ==
Efrim died on 7 August 2025, at the age of 57. Her funeral took place at the Bellu Orthodox Cemetery, on 9 August.
