= Donald A. Bullough =

British historian

Donald Auberon Bullough (13 June 1928 – 26 June 2002) was a British historian who taught and published on the cultural and political history of Italy, England and Carolingian France during the early Middle Ages. He was the brother of mathematician Robin Bullough (d. 2008).

Bullough was educated at Newcastle-under-Lyme High School, then went up to St John's College, Oxford where he took a first in History in 1950. He held a Harmsworth Senior Scholarship at Merton College from 1951 to 1952, and a Fereday Fellowship at St John's between 1952 and 1955.

Bullough was made a Fellow of the Royal Historical Society in 1958, and a Fellow of the Society of Antiquaries of Scotland the following year.

Bullough was successively Lecturer in Medieval History at the University of Edinburgh (1955–1966), Professor of Medieval History at the University of Nottingham (1966–1973) and Professor of Medieval History and Dean of the Faculty of Arts at the University of St Andrews (1973–1991). He was made Corresponding Fellow of the Monumenta Germaniae Historica in 1983.

A collection of essays under the title Early Medieval Rome and the Christian West: Essays in Honour of Donald A. Bullough, edited by Julia Smith, was published in 2000.

Bullough was married twice: firstly in 1963 to Belinda Jane Turland, they had two daughters, their marriage was dissolved in 1994; secondly in 1995 to Dr Alice Harting-Correa.

Bullough died of cancer on 26 June 2002. In honour of his academic achievements, the Institute of Mediaeval Studies at the University of St Andrews created the Donald Bullough Fellowship for a Mediaeval Historian.

== Selected publications ==
- 1965. The Age of Charlemagne. 2nd edition: 1973.
- 1969. "Early medieval social groupings: the terminology of kinship." Past & Present 45 (1969): 3–18.
- 1983. "Burial, community and belief in the early medieval west." In Ideal and reality in Frankish and Anglo-Saxon Society, ed. Patrick Wormald, Donald Bullough & Roger Collins. Oxford. pp. 177–201.
- 1991. Carolingian renewal: sources and heritage.
- 1991. Friends, neighbours and fellow drinkers: aspects of community and conflict in the early medieval west. H.M. Chadwick memorial lectures 1. Cambridge.
- 1996. "St Oswald: monk, bishop and archbishop", in St Oswald of Worcester: Life and Influence, Nicholas Brooks and Catherine Cubitt eds, pp. 1–22
- 2003. Alcuin: achievement and reputation. Ford Lectures. Leiden.

== Sources ==
- Constable, Giles. "Donald Bullough Memoir." In Bullough, Alcuin. Achievement and Reputation. Leiden, 2003. pp. xiii-xv.
- Smith, Julia. "Obituary." In The Independent, 6 July 2002
