= David Emmanuel (mathematician) =

Romanian Jewish mathematician and member of the Romanian Academy

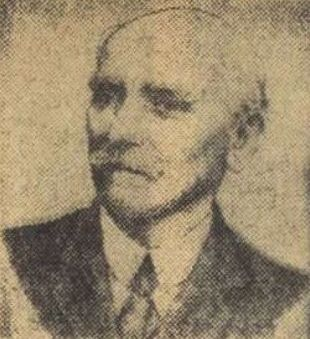
- Born: January 31, 1854; Bucharest, Wallachia
- Died: February 4, 1941 (aged 87); Bucharest, Kingdom of Romania
- Education: University of Paris
- Known for: Founder of modern mathematics school in Romania
- Scientific career
- Fields: Mathematician
- Workplaces: University of Bucharest
- Thesis: Étude des intégrales abstraites du troisième espèce (1879)
- Doctoral advisor: Victor Puiseux
- Notable students: Traian Lalescu; Simion Stoilow; Gheorghe Țițeica

David Emmanuel (31 January 1854 – 4 February 1941) was a Romanian Jewish mathematician and member of the Romanian Academy, considered to be the founder of the modern mathematics school in Romania.

Born in Bucharest, Emmanuel studied at Gheorghe Lazăr and Gheorghe Șincai high schools. In 1873 he went to Paris, where he received his Ph.D. in mathematics from the University of Paris (Sorbonne) in 1879 with a thesis on Study of abelian integrals of the third species, becoming the second Romanian to have a Ph.D. in mathematics from the Sorbonne (the first one was Spiru Haret). The thesis defense committee consisted of Victor Puiseux (advisor), Charles Briot, and Jean-Claude Bouquet.

In 1882, Emmanuel became a professor of superior algebra and function theory at the Faculty of Sciences of the University of Bucharest. Here, in 1888, he held the first courses on group theory and on Galois theory, and introduced set theory in Romanian education. Among his students were Anton Davidoglu, Alexandru Froda, Traian Lalescu, Grigore Moisil, Alexandru Myller, Miron Nicolescu, Octav Onicescu, Dimitrie Pompeiu, Simion Stoilow, and Gheorghe Țițeica. Emmanuel had an important role in the introduction of modern mathematics and of the rigorous approach to mathematics in Romania.

Emmanuel was the president of the first Congress of Romanian Mathematicians, held in 1929 in Cluj. He died in Bucharest in 1941.

A street in the Dorobanți neighborhood of Bucharest is named after him.

== Publications ==
- Emmanuel, David (1879). "Étude des intégrales abéliennes de troisième espèce". Annales Scientifiques de l'École Normale Supérieure. 2. 8: 299–326. doi:10.24033/asens.179. hdl:1908/4249. JFM 11.0318.01.
- Emmanuel, David (1927). Lecṭiuni de teoria funcṭiunilor. II: Funcṭiuni eliptice [Lectures on function theory. II: Elliptic functions] (in Romanian). Bucharest: Cultura Naṭională. JFM 54.0409.06.
