= Cristina Stamate =

Romanian actress

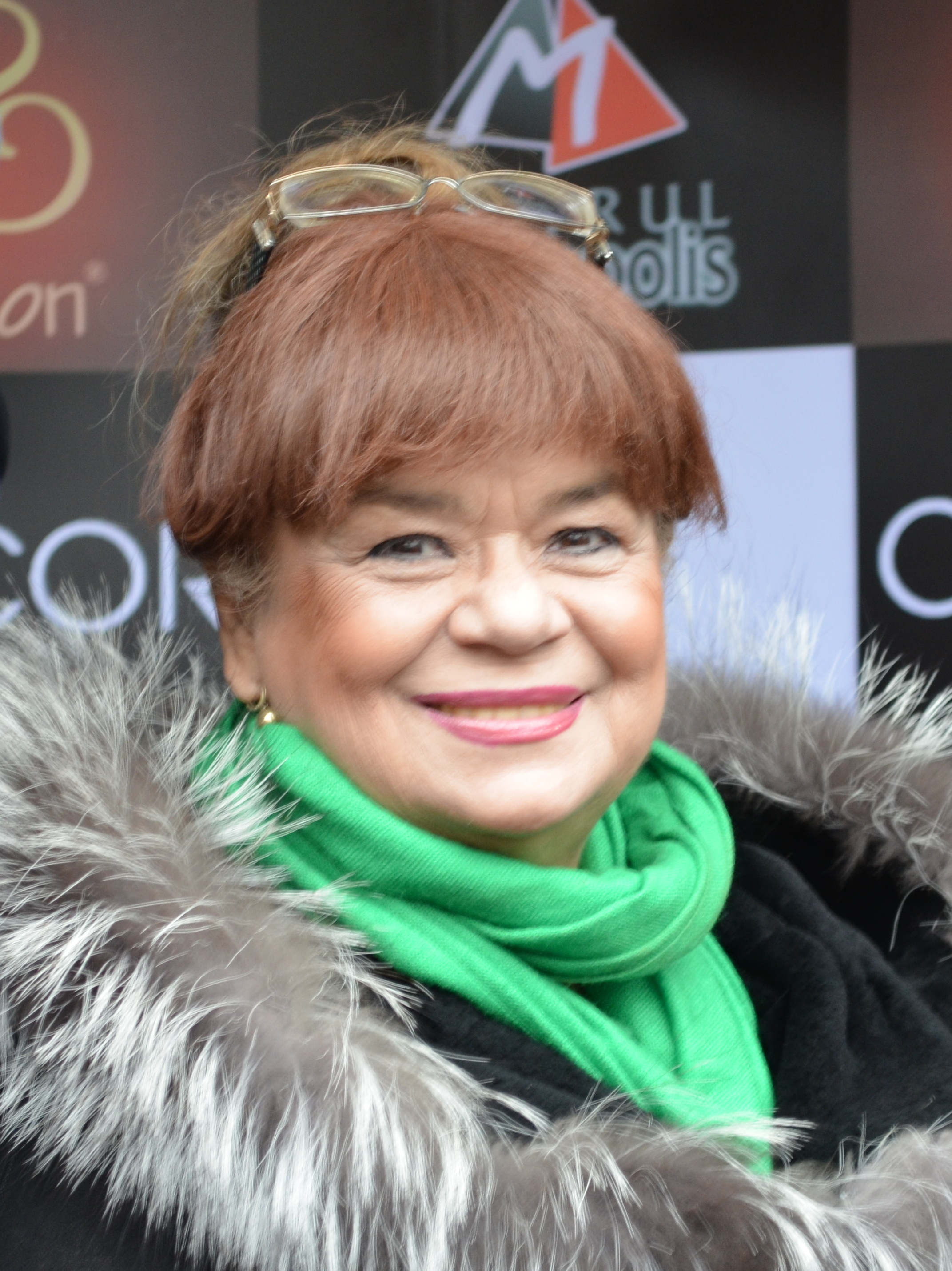
- Stamate in December 2011
- Born: 8 February 1946; Bucharest, Romania
- Died: 27 November 2017 (aged 71); Bucharest, Romania
- Occupation: Actress
- Years active: 1967–2017
- Spouse: Dan Ivănescu (m. 1966; div. 1977)

Cristina Stamate (8 February 1946 – 27 November 2017) was a Romanian actress.

== Life ==
Stamate was born in Bucharest. She credited her older brothers with having fostered her interest in the theatre, by taking her to plays and opera when she was a child.

Having initially studied law, she graduated from Institute of Theatre and Film Arts (IATC) in 1967. Best known as a stage actress, she spent most of her career at the Teatrul de Revistă Constantin Tănase in Bucharest, where she became part of the company after first working in theatre at Arad. She was married to actor Dan Ivănescu in 1966, at the age of twenty, but they had no children and divorced in 1977; she never remarried.

In 2007, she published a cookbook, Sarea în bucate. Reţete culinare inedite; (ISBN 973-659-110-7) Friends stated that she had suffered from serious depression in latter years, after undergoing open heart surgery in January 2015.

In her final interview, she referred to experiences such as the deaths of her parents and her brother, and said that she had gone on acting despite personal mourning. She also expressed regret at not having had children.

== Death ==
Stamate died at Floreasca Hospital, Bucharest, aged 71, after being admitted four days previously, on 23 November, for tests after suffering a stroke. On the day of her death, she learned of her friend, actress Stela Popescu, had died four days earlier.

== Films ==
- Grabeste-te încet (1981)
- The Secret of Bacchus (1984)

== Television ==
- O seara la Revista (2013)

== Theatre ==
Teatrul de Revistă Constantin Tănase

- Arca lui Nae și Vasile
- Bufonii regelui
- Dai un ban, dar face
- Idolul femeilor
- Nimic despre papagali
- Poftă bună lui Tănase
- Revista revistelor
- Te aștept diseară pe Lipscani
- Ura... și la gară
- Vara nu-i ca iarna
