= Tzitzeica equation =

Nonlinear partial differential equation

The Tzitzeica equation is a nonlinear partial differential equation devised by Gheorghe Țițeica in 1907 in the study of differential geometry, describing surfaces of constant affine curvature. The Tzitzeica equation has also been used in nonlinear physics, being an integrable 1+1 dimensional Lorentz invariant system.

$u_{xy}=\exp(u)-\exp(-2 u).$

On substituting

$$w(x, y) = \exp(u(x, y))$$

the equation becomes

$w(x, y)_{y, x} w(x, y)-w(x, y)_{x} w(x, y)_{y}-w(x, y)^3+1 = 0$.

One obtains the traveling solution of the original equation by the reverse transformation $u(x,y)=\ln(w(x,y))$.
