= Gheorghe Țițeica =

Romanian mathematician (1873–1939)

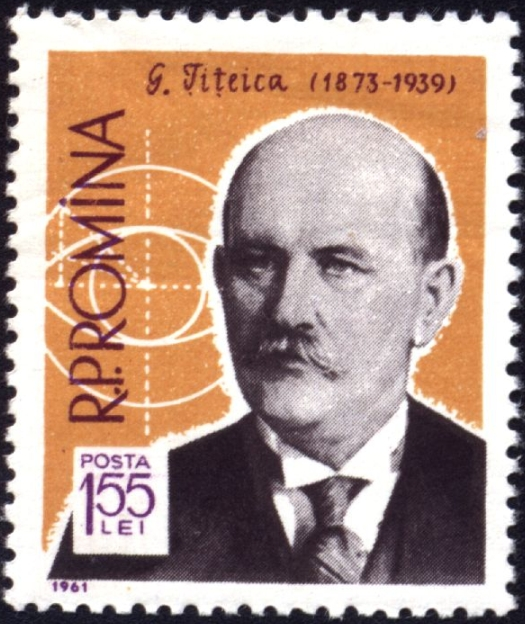
- Gheorghe Țițeica on a Romanian stamp
- Born: 4 October 1873; Turnu Severin, Moldavia and Wallachia
- Died: 5 February 1939 (aged 65); Bucharest, Kingdom of Romania
- Resting place: Bellu Cemetery, Bucharest
- Education: University of Bucharest; University of Paris; École Normale Supérieure
- Known for: Differential geometry Tzitzéica' centro-affine invariant Tzitzeica equation Tzitzéica–Bullough–Dodd equation
- Spouse: Florence Thierin
- Children: Radu, Gabriela, Șerban
- Scientific career
- Fields: Mathematics
- Workplaces: University of Bucharest; Politehnica University of Bucharest
- Thesis: Sur les congruences cycliques et sur les systèmes triplement conjugués (1899)
- Doctoral advisor: Gaston Darboux
- Doctoral students: Dan Barbilian; Grigore Moisil

Gheorghe Țițeica (Romanian pronunciation: [ˈɡe̯orɡe tsiˈtsejka]; 4 October 1873 – 5 February 1939), publishing as George or Georges Tzitzéica, was a Romanian mathematician who made important contributions in geometry. He is recognized as the founder of the Romanian school of differential geometry.

== Education ==
He was born in Turnu Severin, western Oltenia, the son of Anca (née Ciolănescu) and Radu Țiței, originally from Cilibia, in Buzău County. His name was registered as Țițeica–a combination of his parents' surnames. He showed an early interest in science, as well as music and literature. Țițeica was an accomplished violinist, having studied music since childhood: music was to remain his hobby. While studying at the Carol I High School in Craiova, he contributed to the school's magazine, writing the columns on mathematics and studies of literary critique. After graduation in 1892, he obtained a scholarship at the preparatory school in Bucharest, where he also was admitted as a student in the Mathematics Department of University of Bucharest's Faculty of Sciences. His teachers there included David Emmanuel, Spiru Haret, Constantin Gogu, Dimitrie Petrescu, and Iacob Lahovary. In June 1895, he graduated with a Bachelor of Mathematics.

In the summer of 1896, after a stint as a substitute teacher at the Bucharest theological seminary, Țițeica passed his exams for promotion to a secondary school position, becoming teacher in Galați.

In 1897, on the advice of teachers and friends, Țițeica completed his studies at a preparatory school in Paris. Among his mates were Henri Lebesgue and Paul Montel. After ranking first in his class and earning a second undergraduate degree from the Sorbonne in 1897, he was admitted at the École Normale Supérieure, where he took classes with Paul Appell, Gaston Darboux, Édouard Goursat, Charles Hermite, Gabriel Koenigs, Émile Picard, Henri Poincaré, and Jules Tannery. Țițeica chose Darboux to be his thesis advisor; after working for two years on his doctoral dissertation, titled Sur les congruences cycliques et sur les systèmes triplement conjugués, he defended it on 30 June 1899 before a board of examiners consisting of Darboux (as chair), Goursat, and Koenigs.

== Career ==
Upon his return to Romania, Țițeica was appointed assistant professor at the University of Bucharest. He was promoted to full professor on 3 May 1903, retaining this position until his death in 1939. He also taught mathematics at the Polytechnic University of Bucharest, starting in 1928. In 1913, at age 40, Țițeica was elected as a permanent member of the Romanian Academy, replacing Spiru Haret. Later he was appointed in leading roles: in 1922, vice-president of the scientific section, in 1928, vice-president and in 1929 secretary general. Țițeica was also president of the Romanian Mathematical Society, of the Romanian Association of Science, and of the Association of the development and the spreading of science. He was a vice-president of the Polytechnics Association of Romania and member of the High Council of Public Teaching.

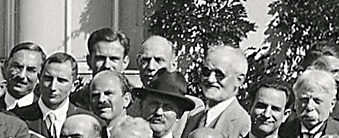
Țițeica at the ICM in Zürich in 1932 (with a hat)

Țițeica was the president of the geometry section at the International Congress of Mathematicians (ICM) in Toronto (1924), Zürich (1932), and Oslo (1936). With 5 invited ICM talks (1908, 1912, 1924, 1932, and 1936), he is in a tie for 7th place among mathematicians with the most invited ICM talks.

He was elected correspondent of the Association of Sciences of Liège and doctor honoris causa of the University of Warsaw. In 1926, 1930, and 1937 he gave a series of lectures as titular professor at the Faculty of Sciences in Sorbonne. He also gave many lectures at the Free University of Brussels (1926) and the University of Rome (1927).

His Ph.D. students include Dan Barbilian and Grigore Moisil.

== Scientific work ==
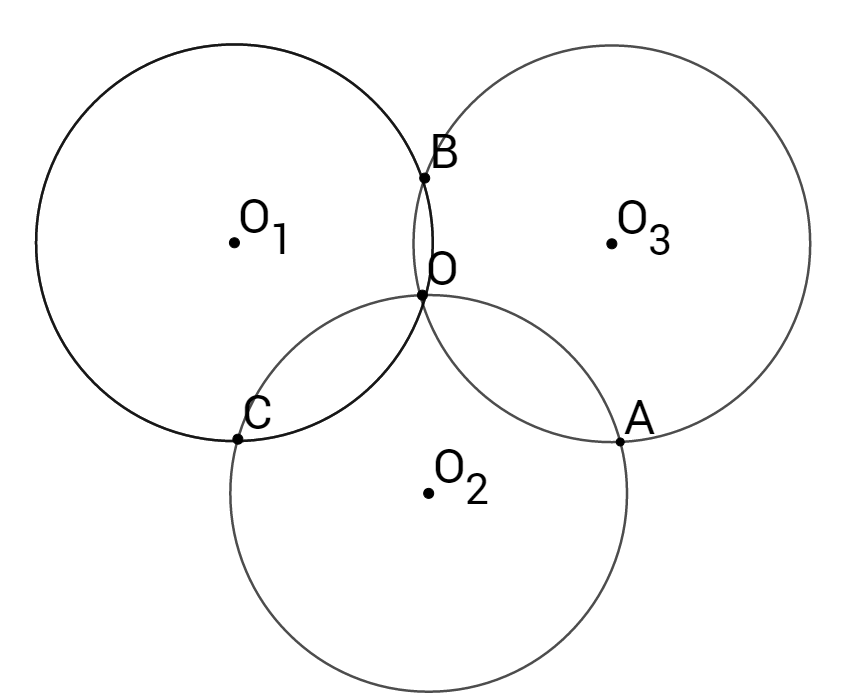
Țițeica's 5 lei coin problem

Țițeica wrote about 400 articles, of which 96 are scientific projects, most addressing problems of differential geometry. His bibliography includes over 200 published papers and books, which appeared in many editions. Carrying on the researches of the American geometer of German origin Ernest Wilczynski, Țițeica discovered a new class of surfaces and a new class of curves which now carry his name. His contributions represent the beginning of a new chapter in mathematics, namely, affine differential geometry. He also studied webs in n-dimensional space, defined through Laplace equations. He investigated what is now known as the Tzitzeica equation, which was further generalized by Robin Bullough and Roger Dodd (the Tzitzéica–Bullough–Dodd equation).

He is also known for a result on the geometry of circles and triangles in the plane, referred to as Țițeica's 5 lei coin problem, a problem he proposed (and solved) at the Gazeta Matematică contest in Galați in 1908. The problem was posed independently by Roger Arthur Johnson in 1916, and the resulting configuration is also referred to as the Johnson circles.

== Private life and legacy ==
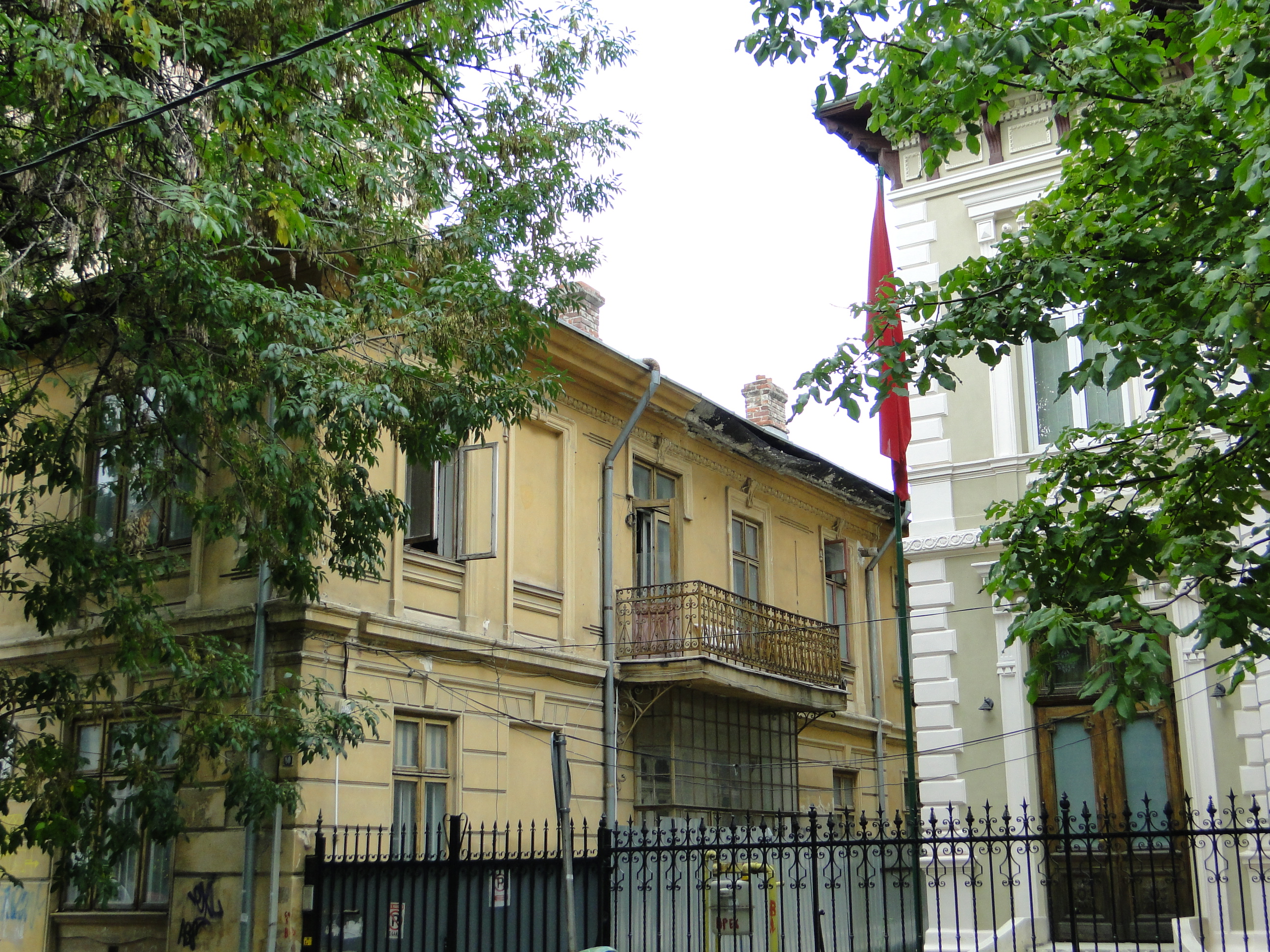
The Țițeica house

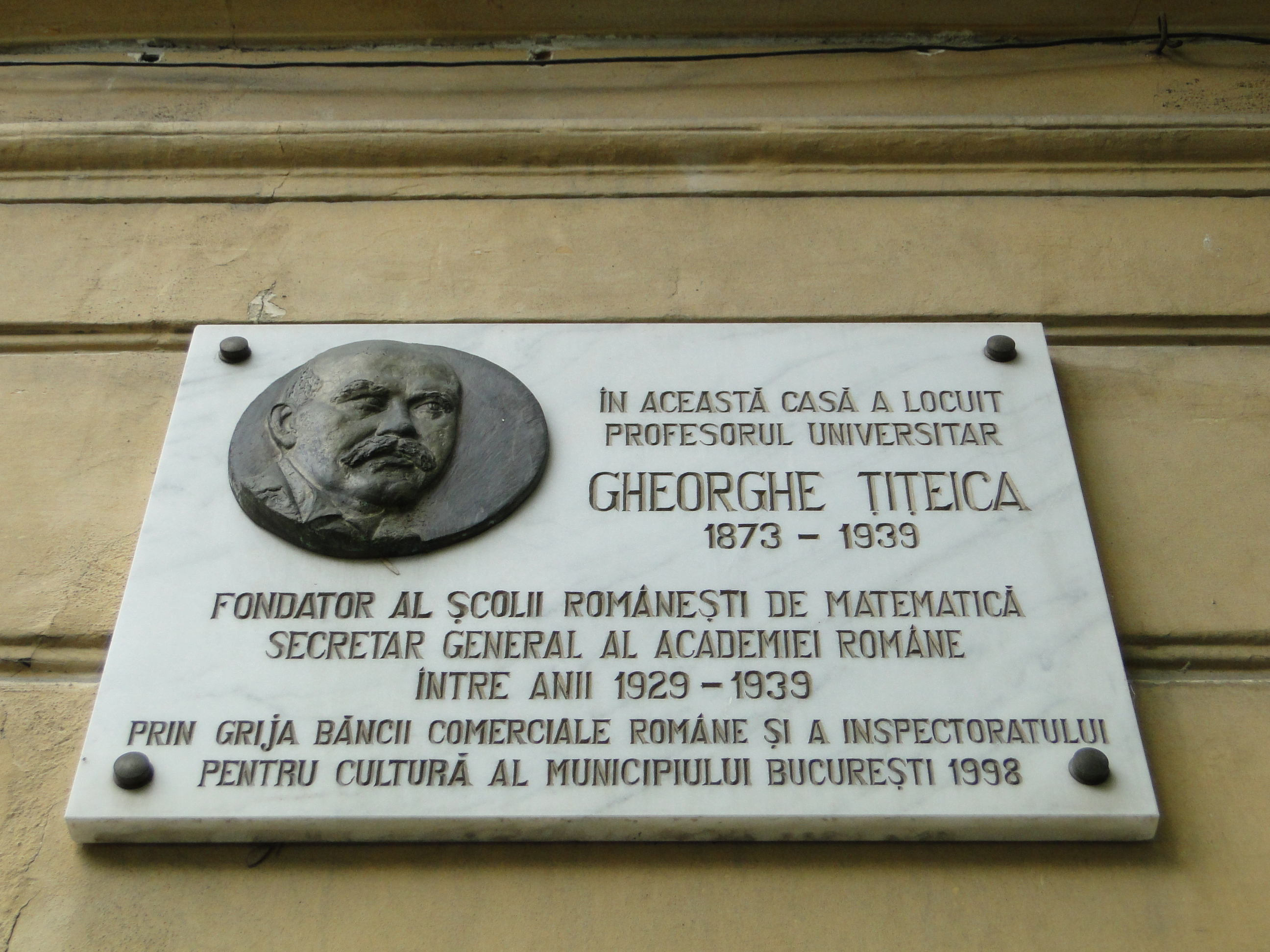
Commemorative plaque

Țițeica married Florence Thierin (1882–1965) and the couple had three children — Radu (1905–1987), Gabriela (1907–1987), and Șerban (1908–1985) — all of whom pursued careers in academia; the youngest one became a renowned quantum physicist. The family lived in a 19th-century house on Dionisie Lupu Street, close to Lahovari Plaza, in Sector 1 of Bucharest; Țițeica moved there around 1913, when he was elected to the academy. A commemorative plaque was affixed to the house by the city administration in 1998. He died in 1939 in Bucharest and was buried in the city's Bellu Cemetery.

A high school in Drobeta-Turnu Severin and a gymnasium in Craiova bear his name, and so does a street in Sector 2 of Bucharest. The Romanian Academy offers an annual "Gheorghe Țițeica Prize" for achievements in mathematics. The logo of the 40th International Mathematical Olympiad, held in Bucharest in 1999, was inspired by Țițeica's 5 lei coin problem.

In 1961, Poșta Română issued a 1.55 lei stamp in his honor (Scott #1415); he also figures on a 2 lei stamp from 1945 commemorating the founding of Gazeta Matematică in 1895 (Scott #596).

== Publications ==
- Tzitzéica, Georges (1899). "Sur les congruences cycliques et sur les systèmes triplement conjugués". Annales Scientifiques de l'École Normale Supérieure (in French). 16: 137–192. doi:10.24033/asens.465. MR 1508967.
- Tzitzéica, G. (1907). "Sur une nouvelle classes de surfaces". Comptes rendus de l'Académie des Sciences (in French). 144: 1257–1259. JFM 38.0642.01.
- Tzitzéica, G. (1908). "Sur une nouvelle classes de surfaces". Rendiconti del Circolo Matematico di Palermo (in French). 25: 180–187. doi:10.1007/BF03029121. JFM 39.0685.05. S2CID 121145943.
- Tzitzéica, G. (1909). "Sur une nouvelle classes de surfaces (Deuxième Partie)". Rendiconti del Circolo Matematico di Palermo (in French). 28: 210–216. doi:10.1007/BF03018218. JFM 40.0668.04. S2CID 121727180.
- Tzitzéica, G. (1920). "La géométrie différentielle projective des réseaux". Revue générale des sciences pures et appliquées (in French). 31: 349–353. JFM 47.0696.02.
- Tzitzéica, G. (1931), Introduction à la géométrie différentielle projective des courbes, Mémorial des sciences mathématiques (in French), vol. 47, 61 pages, JFM 57.0952.04
