= Șerban Țițeica =

Romanian physicist (1908-1985)

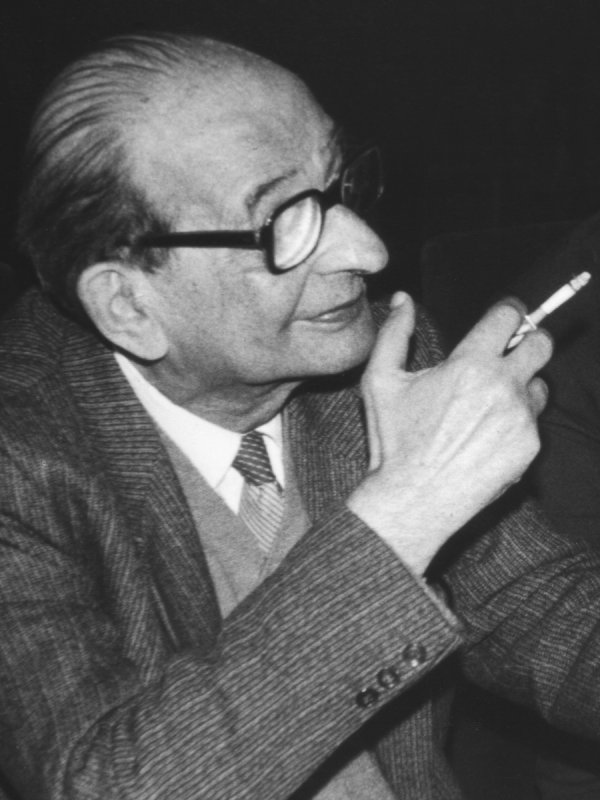
- Șerban Țițeica, c. 1980
- Born: 27 March 1908; Bucharest, Kingdom of Romania
- Died: 28 May 1985 (aged 77); Bucharest, Socialist Republic of Romania
- Resting place: Bellu Cemetery, Bucharest
- Education: University of Bucharest; Leipzig University
- Father: Gheorghe Țițeica
- Awards: Order of the Star of the Romanian Socialist Republic, 2nd class
- Scientific career
- Workplaces: Politehnica University of Bucharest; Alexandru Ioan Cuza University; University of Bucharest
- Thesis: On the behaviour of electrical resistance of metals in magnetic field (1935)
- Doctoral advisor: Werner Heisenberg

Șerban Țițeica (27 March [O.S. 14 March] 1908 – 28 May 1985) was a Romanian quantum physicist. He is regarded as the founder of the Romanian school of theoretical physics.

The third and last child of mathematician Gheorghe Țițeica, he was born in Bucharest, where he attended Mihai Viteazul High School. He then went to the University of Bucharest, graduating in 1929 with a degree in Physics and Chemistry and another in Mathematics. That year, he met Enrico Fermi, who gave three talks at his alma mater; upon Fermi's recommendation, he pursued his studies at Leipzig University from 1930 to 1934 under Werner Heisenberg, earning a doctorate in 1935, with thesis "On the behaviour of electrical resistance of metals in magnetic field".

Țițeica taught at Politehnica University of Bucharest from 1935 to 1941 as assistant professor, and was then a professor at the University of Iași (1941–1948) and the University of Bucharest (1949–1977). He became a titular member of the Romanian Academy in 1955, and served as its vice president from 1963 until his death in his native city.

Țițeica was a member of the Academy of Sciences of the USSR and of the Saxon Academy of Sciences and Humanities in Leipzig. He was also the Vice-Director of the Joint Institute for Nuclear Research in Dubna (1962–1964), and a member of the Council of the European Physical Society (1970–1975). In 1971 he was awarded the Order of the Star of the Romanian Socialist Republic, 2nd class.

He is buried at Bellu Cemetery, in Bucharest.
