= List of Romanian composers =

The following is a list of Romanian composers.

- Liana Alexandra (1947–2011), neoromantic composer and pianist
- Elena Asachi (1789–1877), Austrian-born Romanian composer, pianist, and singer
- Nicolas Astrinidis (1921–2010), composer who settled and worked in Greece
- Anton Pann (1796–1854), composer, folklorist, orthodox chanter
- Esmeralda Athanasiu-Gardeev (1834–1917), composer and pianist
- Ana-Maria Avram (1961–2017), spectral music composer
- Maya Badian (1945–), Romanian-born Canadian composer and musicologist
- Filaret Barbu (1903–1984), composer, known for the operetta Ana Lugojana
- Pascal Bentoiu (1927–2016), Modernist composer
- Tiberiu Brediceanu (1877–1968), composer and folklorist
- Nicolae Bretan (1887–1968), opera composer, also baritone, conductor and critic
- Ion Căianu (1629–1687), the first to record the custom Călușari dance
- Dimitrie Cantemir (1673–1723), composer, historian, writer, folklorist
- Carmen Maria Cârneci (1957–), composer, conductor, essayst
- Eduard Caudella (1841–1924), composer, wrote the first Romanian opera, Petru Rareș
- Sergiu Celibidache (1912–1996), composer and conductor
- Maia Ciobanu (1952–)
- Paul Constantinescu (1909–1963), composer, especially of religious and vocal music, also wrote music for Romanian films
- Vladimir Cosma (born 1940), composer, conductor and violinist
- Dimitrie Cuclin (1885–1978), classical music composer, musicologist, philosopher, translator, and writer
- Constantin Dimitrescu (1847–1928), composer of Peasant Dance
- Violeta Dinescu (1953–), composer and pianist
- Grigoraș Dinicu (1889–1949), composer best known for his violin showpiece Hora staccato
- Felicia Donceanu (1931–), composer best known for chamber works, painter, and sculptor
- Sabin Drăgoi (1894–1968), composer and folklorist, one of the pioneers of scientific gathering of Romanian folklore
- Iancu Dumitrescu (1944–), avant-garde music composer
- George Enescu (1881–1955), composer, violinist, pianist, conductor and teacher
- Valentin Gheorghiu (1928–2023), pianist and composer
- Irina Olga Hasnaș (1954–)
- Philip Herschkowitz (1906–1989), Romanian-born American composer
- Ioana Ilie (*1988), pianist, improviser, composer and teacher
- Ion Ivanovici (1845–1902), composer of The Danube Waves waltz
- Mihail Jora (1891–1971), "the father of Romanian ballet"; works include Intoarcerea din adâncuri and La piață
- Nicolae Kirculescu (1903–1985), composer of theatre and film music, including the theme of the television programme Teleenciclopedia
- Dumitru Georgescu Kiriac (1866–1928)
- Sorin Lerescu (1953–)
- Sammy Lerner (1903–1989), Romanian-born American composer
- György Ligeti (1923–2006), Transylvanian-born Hungarian and Austrian composer
- Dinu Lipatti (1917–1950), pianist and composer
- Myriam Marbe (1931–1997), composer and pianist
- Cristian Matei (1977–)
- Marcel Mihalovici (1898–1985)
- Teo Milea (1982–), pianist and composer
- Gavriil Musicescu (1847–1903), composer, conductor and musicologist
- Octavian Nemescu (1940–2020), composer and professor
- Grigore Nica (1936–2009), composer and teacher
- Șerban Nichifor (1954–), neoromantic composer and cellist
- Ştefan Niculescu (1927–2008), composer and professor
- Irina Odăgescu (1937–), music educator and composer
- Tiberiu Olah (1928–2002), composer, teacher, and musicologist
- Anton Pann (1790s–1854), wrote Romania's national anthem and music for the Orthodox Divine Liturgy
- Cristian Pațurcă (1964–2011)
- Ionel Perlea (1900–1970), composer and conductor
- Carmen Petra Basacopol (1926–2023), composer, pianist, and academic
- Elise Popovici (1921-2011)
- Ciprian Porumbescu (1853–1883), composer
- Horațiu Rădulescu (1942–2008), Romanian-French composer of spectral music
- Doina Rotaru (1951–), composer of mainly orchestral and chamber works
- Constantin Silvestri (1913–1969), composer, lived in England
- Matei Socor (1908–1980), composer and musician
- Aurel Stroe (1932–2008), composer and philosopher
- Cornelia Tăutu (1938–), composer best known for film soundtracks
- Octave Octavian Teodorescu (1963–)
- Sigismund Toduță (1908–1991)
- Cornel Trăilescu (1926–), opera composer and conductor
- Anatol Vieru (1926–1998), composer of symphonic, chamber and choral music; winner of Herder Prize in 1986
- Marina Marta Vlad (1949–), composer
- Roman Vlad (1919–2013), Romanian-born Italian composer, pianist and musicologist
