= Costin Miereanu =

French composer and musicologist (1943–2025)

- Born: 27 February 1943; Bucharest, Romania
- Died: 20 August 2025 (aged 82) Tours, France
- Genres: Experimental music; Contemporary classical music; minimal music; electroacoustic music
- Occupations: Musician; composer; musicologist
- Instrument: Keyboard instruments
- Years active: 1965–2015

Costin Miereanu (27 February 1943 – 20 August 2025) was a French composer and musicologist of Romanian origin.

== Biography ==
Miereanu was born in Bucharest in 1943. At the age of eleven, he enrolled in the Bucharest School of Music, where he completed six years of study in piano and chamber music. Following this, he balanced his time between a music academy and a standard secondary education. His dual studies culminated in a science baccalaureate and a degree in piano concert and teaching, after which he continued his musical journey at the Bucharest Conservatory for another six years (1960-1966), studying with Alfred Mendelsohn, Tiberiu Olah, Ștefan Niculescu, Dan Constantinescu, Myriam Marbé, Aurel Stroe, Anton Vieru, and Octavian Lazăr Cosma. He became accointed with composers Iancu Dumitrescu and Horațiu Rădulescu, and started to get immersed into avant-garde music and simultaneously begins his musicological career, writing articles for journals and magazines.

Between 1967 and 1969, he was a student of Karlheinz Stockhausen, György Ligeti, and Erhard Karkoschka at the Ferienkurse für neue Musik in Darmstadt. In September 1968, Miereanu travelled to Paris to sign a contract with Éditions Salabert and did not return to communist Romania until after the fall and death of Nicolae Ceausescu (in December 1989).

In Paris, his initial musical explorations led him to a course at the Groupe de Recherches Musicales and Pierre Schaeffer's class at the Conservatoire National Supérieur de Musique. He choose Jean-Etienne Marie’s electroacoustic class at the Schola Cantorum instead, where he studied for two years. In 1970, with the aid of a grant from the Cité internationale des arts, he enrolled at Vincennes University of Paris VIII, where he encountered the musicologist Daniel Charles, who became very influential to him. He also attended Algirdas Julien Greimas’s courses on general semantics at the École des Hautes Études en Sciences Sociales. While lecturing at the University of Paris VIII from 1973 and teaching at several conservatories, Miereanu pursued advanced degrees, completing a DEA with Greimas and Roland Barthes, followed by his doctoral thesis, which he defended with Greimas in 1978. In 1979, he successfully defended his Thèse d’Etat ès Lettres at Sorbonne University with Charles. In 1977, he became a French citizen.

Miereanu taught at the Music Department of the University of Paris VIII in Vincennes between 1973 and 1981. Since 1981, he has been Professor of Philosophy, Aesthetics, and the Science of Art at the Sorbonne, as well as becoming artistic director of Éditions Salabert (in 1981) and co-founder (with Iannis Xenakis and others) of the Foundation Salabert (in 1981). He was also co-artistic director of the Ensemble 2e2m between 1982 and 1985, and in 1983 he became director of the Centre de Recherches en Esthétique des Arts Musicaux at the University of Paris 1 Panthéon-Sorbonne. In 1991, he became director of the laboratory "Esthétique des Arts Contemporains", associated with the CNRS.

He was awarded the Gaudeamus International Composers Award in 1967, the Prix Georges Enesco of the SACEM in 1974, and the Prix de la Partition Pédagogique of the SACEM in 1992.

In the late 1970s and early 1980s, Miereanu was associated with the Groupe d'étude et réalisation musicale (GERM), founded by Pierre Mariétan in 1966. Miereanu was also close to the composers around Ensemble l'Itinéraire (notably Tristan Murail and Gérard Grisey).

The influence of semiotic thinking on Miereanu's musical narrativity and his polymorphous idea of art, which he called Poly-Art, were extensively described in a book, Fuite et conquête du champ musical, published in 1995 by Editions Klincksieck, with a preface by Daniel Charles.

Miereanu died on 20 August 2025, aged 82, in Chambray-lès-Tours, France.

== Music ==
Miereanu evolved his compositional style featuring a sensuous sonic fabric by combining of Erik Satie's techniques and John Cage's indeterminacy with an abstraction of Romanian traditional and art music, among many other sources. Many of his works include visual components and Miereanu produced several experimental movies to be projected with his music performances. He has composed more than one hundred cataloged pieces – aleatoric works, musique concrète, semi-improvised piece for solo synthesizer, music for orchestra and chamber orchestra (often using pre-recorded tape material), as well as pieces for theatre, ballet, and educational music.

=== Luna Cinese ===
In 1975, Miereanu recorded the electroacoustic piece Luna Cinese for the Italian label Cramps Records at Ricordi Studios in Milan, with the help of Walter Marchetti and Martin Davorin-Jagodić. Musicologist Sam Ridout writes that, "the disc represents an attempt to reconcile the conception of the open work developed from the early 1970s with the form of the record (...) The piece in many ways recalls the recordings of another Parisian admirer of Cage, Luc Ferrari, combining fragments of speech in different languages, recordings of everyday noises and soundscapes, arranged through long duration, scarcely perceptible loops." Composer Keith Fullerton Whitman writes that, "Do, aside from “Dark Side-long Aleatoric Electro-Acoustic Collage,” what does it sound like you ask? Imagine Xenakis’ bells-and-trinkets epic Bohor overlaid with Basil Kirchin’s Worlds within Worlds and generations of pan-linguistic self-help / instructional programs – at any given time in the piece there are at least 4-5 separate layers of gated textures, field recordings, dissonant / glassy ensemble playing, and a bed of Synthesized Drone-sound."

Miereanu was subsequently included in the Nurse With Wound list (1979) and Luna Cinese remains a cult record for many younger composers and listeners.

=== Poly-Art Records ===
Miereanu founded his own label called Poly-Art International/Records around 1982, to release his own minimalist and proto-ambient music, mostly solo synthesizer pieces (on Minimoog, Polymoog, PPG Wave, Sequential Circuits's Prophet-10, etc.). He self-published two cassettes, Le Royaume de la Reine Pellapouf (recorded 1977-78) and Fata Morgana (recorded 1981), as well as four LPs, Dérives (recorded 1976-1978), Pianos-Miroirs (recorded 1978-1979), Jardins Oubliés (recorded 1981), and Carrousel (recorded 1982). Alan Licht included Dérives in his Minimal Top Ten List #4 and wrote "Both sides/pieces on Dérives are superb, comprised of long drones with flurries of skittering electronic activity popping up here and there." Parallels have been drawn with the works of Harold Budd and Brian Eno, David Behrman and Terry Riley from the same period, and these records have been described as "some of the most essential yet overlooked documents of French minimalism, early ambient, and nonconformist contemporary music from that era."

== Legacy ==
His piece Finis-Terre (1978) is featured in Gaspar Noé's short film The Art Of Filmmaking (2020), featuring Béatrice Dalle and Charlotte Gainsbourg.

His six Poly-Art records have been reissued in a boxset by Auryfa and Metaphon in 2025, remastered from original master tapes by Stephan Mathieu.

== Selected works ==
- Monostructure I, for two orchestras
- Monostructure II, for strings, brass, and tape
- Das Ende krönt das Werk, for piano and six instrumental groups
- In der Nacht der Zeiten, aleatoric music for instruments and tape
- Couleurs du temps I, for string orchestra
- Couleurs du tempsII for string quartet and tape (1968)
- Monostructures I, for brass and strings (1966)
- Couleurs du temps III for double string quartet and double bass
- Finis coronat opus, for piano and six instrumental groups (1966)
- Espaces II for twenty stringed instruments, piano, and tape (1967–69)
- Espace dernier, aleatoric music for choir, six instrumental groups, and tape (1966–69)
- Rosario, for large orchestra (1973–76)
- Domingo, for vocal quintet and variable instruments (1974)
- Planetarium, for two flutes, trombone, and two percussionists (1975)
- Raum jenseits von gestern, aleatoric music for chamber orchestra
- L'Avenir est dans les œufs, opera (1980)
- Le jardin de sécrets, for soprano, alto flute or viola, bass clarinet, trombone, piano, and accordion or electric organ (1980)
- Cuivres célestes, for brass quintet, two percussionists, and strings (1981)
- Labyrinthes d’Adrien, for soprano and ensemble (1981)
- Miroirs célestes, for orchestra (1981–83)
- Kammerkonzert, for saxophone and nine instruments (1985)
- Doppel(kammer)konzert, for saxophone, percussion, and chamber orchestra (1985)
- D’un régard moiré, for woodwind quartet, string trio, double bass, piano, and percussion (1988)
- Sextuplum, for six percussionists (1988–89)
- Ricochets, saxophone(s), electric guitar, bass guitar, synthesizer, and percussion (1989)
- D’un source oubliée, for harpsichord and string sextet (1989)
- Un temps sans mémoire, for orchestra (1989–92)
- Immersion, for saxophone(s) and tape (1990)
- La Porte du paradis, lyric fantasie (1991)
- De humani corporis fabbrica, ballet (1992)
- Les miroirs invisibles, for string sextet (1992)
- Vol du temps, canticum sacrum in memoriam Jean-Pierre Ouvrard, for mixed choir a cappella, or mixed choir and three percussionists (1993)
- Solo III, for solo violin (1995)
- Solo IV, rythmodies, for amplified basson (1995)
- Solo V, for oboe, or cor anglais, or baritone oboe (1995)
- Solo VI, for solo cello (1995)
- Solo VII, for solo viola (1995)
- Orison, ballet (1999)
- Symphony No. 3 "Blick auf die Frühe" (2001)
