= Lucia Bercescu-Țurcanu =

Romanian and American soprano (1911–1995)

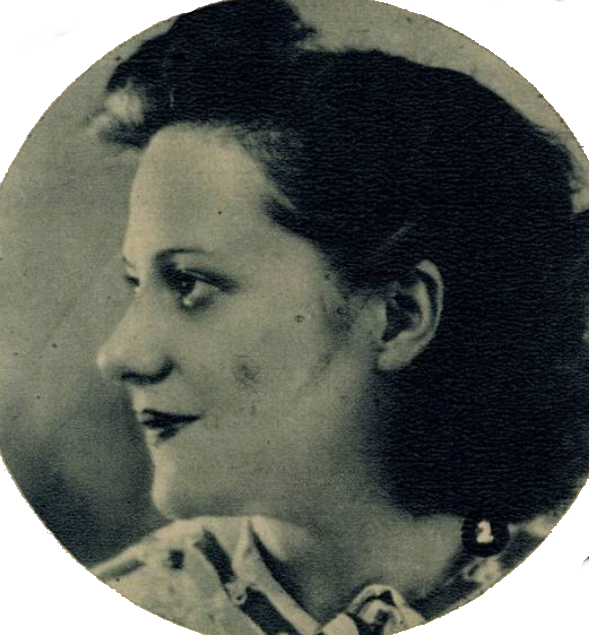
- Bercescu-Țurcanu in 1942
- Born: Lucia Bercescu; March 27, 1911; Bucharest, Kingdom of Romania
- Died: June 26, 1995 (aged 84); Bucharest, Romania
- Other name: Lucia Turcano
- Occupations: Soprano; Voice teacher
- Spouse: Constantin Țurcanu (died 1973)

Lucia Bercescu-Țurcanu, also known as Lucia Turcano or Turkano (born Lucia Bercescu, March 27, 1911 – June 26, 1995), was a Romanian and American soprano. A native of Bucharest, she was trained as an opera singer in that city, also performing folk music and recording romances. She made her debut at the Romanian National Opera in 1939 where she was a leading prima donna until 1946. There she met and married the opera conductor Constantin Țurcanu with whom she frequently collaborated. She also worked regularly at the Vienna Volksoper during World War II, and performed with the Bucharest Radio Orchestra in Croatia. The Țurcanus were in Bucharest after the anti-fascist coup of August 1944, though Lucia spent some time touring the Hungarian Republic with acclaimed versions of Aida and Madame Butterfly. She also performed at galas organized by left-wing groups, including the Romanian Communist Party, but overall resented Romania's communization; the Țurcanus emigrated in 1947, selling their belongings.

Bercescu-Țurcanu was a leading soprano in Italy's major opera houses in the late 1940s. Her husband worked as a conductor at La Scala while she was prima donna there from 1946 to 1949. In 1949 the Țurcanus came to the United States at the invitation of opera impresario Alfredo Salmaggi on a temporary visa. They were active with American opera companies into the early 1950s. Not wishing to return to communist-aligned Romania, they stayed in the United States under tenuous circumstances in which deportation was a possibility. They ultimately became American citizens in 1954 when a federal bill written on their behalf was signed into law by American president Dwight D. Eisenhower. In addition to working as a musician, Lucia supported her husband's work in the United States as an ordained priest in the Romanian Orthodox Church.

Bercescu-Țurcanu also worked as a voice teacher in Worcester, Massachusetts, and Detroit, Michigan. She and her husband returned to Romania in 1963, where she resumed her opera and concert career, while Constantin composed and conducted until his death ten years later. Lucia's own career ended when she was blacklisted by the communist authorities; though still referred to as one of Romania's greatest voices, she could no longer appear on the stage. She lived through the fall of communism, after which she was honored publicly by other members of her profession. She died in Bucharest in 1995, aged 84.

== Early life and debut ==
Lucia Bercescu was born in Bucharest, capital of the Romanian Kingdom, on March 27, 1911. In April 1930, she was mentioned in Rampa journal as one of the eminent students at Egizio Massini's music school. She then studied with voice teachers Demetru Baziliu and Elena Saghin at the Bucharest Conservatory. Her professional opera debut occurred at the Romanian National Opera, Bucharest (RNOB) in 1939 where she first appeared as Marguerite in Gounod's Faust. She was offered a longterm contract at that theatre by George Georgescu immediately following this performance. Credited as "Miss Lucia Bercescu", she sang at a March 1939 concert organized by the State Railways at Gara de Nord. She also appeared at a Straja Țării-organized concert for Christmas, with a recital of Romanian folk songs. Not long after this she met and married opera conductor Constantin Țurcanu (sometimes given as Constantino Turcano).

Now billed as Lucia Bercescu-Țurcanu, she was a principal soprano at the RNOB from 1939 to 1946. According to journalist Scarlat Răutu she was initially sidelined at the theatre in her twenties, being limited to the role of Marguerite. Răutu observed that this was especially unfair, given that she embodied a national prototype, the "Dacian" woman—whose on-stage persona combined "Levantine sensuality" and "Scandinavian nostalgia." Composer Mihail Jora similarly commented that the RNOB had used her rarely, "perhaps out of pettiness", but that this had unwittingly conserved her pitch. At the time, she was doing work for the Romanian Radio Broadcasting Company, which aired her rendition of various romances in June 1940. During early 1941, she was cast as Princess Ruxandra in Alexandru Zirra's new opera, Alexandru Lăpușneanu. Jora was especially impressed with her, calling hers "the most beautiful female voice ever to have graced the Romanian Opera." In December, Zirra's work was also staged at the National Theater Bucharest. In his review of that production, Alexandru Anestin noted that she had been outstanding in the "extremely hard role" of Ruxandra. In tandem, she was cast as Countess Almaviva in Mozart's The Marriage of Figaro.

This period coincided with World War II and, at home, with the establishment of Ion Antonescu's dictatorship. On June 5, 1941, Bercescu-Țurcanu performed alongside Maria Tănase at a Council of Patronage benefit-show, also attended by Antonescu's wife Maria. In December, after Romania had entered the war as an ally of Nazi Germany, she sang one of her husband's doine at a ceremony honoring the Wehrmacht; held at the Romanian Atheneum, this function was also attended by Georgescu, Manfred Freiherr von Killinger, and Ion Marin Sadoveanu. In June 1942, she toured nationally with Alexandru Lăpușneanu, reaching Brașov. A local critic, Lia Busuioceanu, admired her "golden voice" and her physique, but noted that her diction needed improvement.

== First European breakthroughs ==
During her early thirties, Bercescu-Țurcanu was a guest artist at several locations in Nazi-occupied Europe. She thus worked at the Croatian National Theatre (HNK) and the Stadttheater Danzig. She also made multiple appearances at the Vienna Volksoper; her debut at that theatre was as Verdi's Aida in September 1942 (with Josef Gostic as Radamés and Georgescu as conductor), though Răutu believes that it may have been as Floria in Puccini's Tosca. Heinrich Damisch of the Kronen Zeitung observed that the production was a "resounding success", with Bercescu-Țurcanu "instantly [elevated] to diva status, now a star of the theatrical firmament." Writing for the Wiener Montagblatt, Richard Soukup described this Aida as an "intoxicatingly beautiful polyphony of the most beautiful voices", adding: "[Bercescu-Țurcanu is] less of a striking presence, but as an emotional voice... hers is full of color and soul, secure and clear". Her appearances in that role were interrupted later that month, when she became seriously ill and had to undergo surgery in Nazified Austria.

In October 1942, Bercescu-Țurcanu sang for a charity event (Servus-Konzert) in Vienna, celebrating the German–Romanian friendship. She was Aida in a new Volksoper version, which began in early 1943 after Georgescu's departure; Dinu Bădescu did Radamés, singing his role in Romanian. According to Răutu, her time at the Volksoper meant that she could no longer be sidestepped at RNOB, allowing her to have a diverse repertoire. New roles in Bucharest included Elsa in Wagner's Lohengrin, Verdi's Leonora in Il trovatore and Violetta in La traviata, and the title roles in Aida and Tosca. Other roles she performed during her early career included Agathe in Weber's Der Freischütz (rated by critic Romeo Alexandrescu as one of the most memorable opera acts of 1943) and Eva in Wagner's Die Meistersinger von Nürnberg.

In January 1944, the Țurcanus were in the Independent State of Croatia with the Bucharest Radio Orchestra. In celebration of the Day of Unification, they performed live on Radio Zagreb; the compositions used in the recital were by Constantin Brăiloiu, George Enescu, and Constantin Țurcanu himself. Returning to the HNK, Lucia reprised her Aida to a reported "jam-packed hall". During May, she appeared in a Tosca performance alongside the Cluj Opera Company, which had relocated to Timișoara after the Second Vienna Award. A local critic panned the show: while Bercescu-Țurcanu had delighted the public with her acting, as well as with "her vocal quality and intensity", "the blatant awkwardness of the local Opera's soloists and choir members has continuously robbed [spectators] of even a visual pleasure".

== Communization era ==
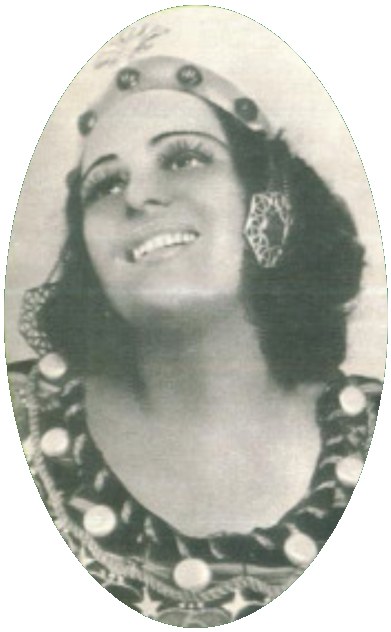
Bercescu-Țurcanu as Rachel in La Juive

In July 1944, just before the Soviet penetration into Romania, it was announced that Bercescu-Țurcanu and her colleagues at the RNOB were going on an extended tour of the provinces. Her team was set to sing in places from Pucioasa to Hațeg. On August 17, six days ahead of the anti-fascist coup in Bucharest, she performed at the Petroșani workers' casino. In October, she and the entire RNOB could return to Soviet-occupied Bucharest, resuming performances of Tosca. She was again praised, including by the România Liberă, a central organ of the Communist Party (PCR). Its house critic, E. Vergu, only observed that the stagecraft was antiquated, and that Bercescu-Țurcanu's facial expressions were "rather overdone". On November 5, she performed at a RNOB festival honoring the Red Army.

Forming the Enescu Chamber Orchestra around the same time, Constantin Țurcanu had Lucia employed as its soloist. After a concert they held in February 1945, Universul paper declared that she was also the orchestra's animator, driven by her "overwhelming vocal dedication". By early 1946, both husband and wife had returned to the Radio Orchestra, and were giving new concerts. In the PCR daily, Scînteia, Edgar Elian praised Constantin as a hard-working conductor, and upheld Lucia as a guiding light of classical music in her relatively young generation. On her own, Bercescu-Țurcanu was touring with Puccini's Madame Butterfly, in which she had the lead role of Cio-Cio-San. Her travels had ended by July, when she sued her impresario, Mihail Ghidionescu, over outstanding fees.

From January 1946, Bercescu-Țurcanu appeared as Rachel in Halévy's La Juive, produced by the RNOB. The premiere was attended by the Prime Minister of Romania, Petru Groza, accompanied by the Soviet Ambassador, Sergey Kavtaradze. Groza personally congratulated her and the other performers, adding his musings about the communists' "exceptional care regarding artistic manifestations for the masses, [as] a focus that is currently brought to the forefront far more prominently than in bygone days." In the Jewish community weekly, Unirea, a critic noted that she was still Romania's "best dramatic soprano", who could expect to triumph anywhere in the world. Also that month, Bercescu-Țurcanu appeared as a guest performer at the Socialist Group for Art and Culture, which was a cultural branch of the Social Democratic Party (itself part of the governing coalition), and at the PCR's own commemoration of Romain Rolland.

== Hungarian tour and Italian departure ==
In March 1946, while becoming a regular entertainer at PCR conferences, Bercescu-Țurcanu joined Aura Buzescu, Pál Jávor and George Vraca in performing at a Bucharest gala, which promoted Hungaro–Romanian cooperation; the show was overseen by Dezső Keresztury. In April, she went on an acclaimed tour of the Hungarian Republic—as part of an artists' exchange between the RNOB and the Hungarian State Opera House. After her first performances there, critic Endre Gaál commented: "Budapest will learn the name Lucia Bercescu in no time. This Aida with her twinkling eyes, blessed with magnificent acting skills, seems to be a universal singer." Composer Sándor Jemnitz was similarly encouraging, declaring her "a phenomenal voice" of "hot, burning, sincere passion", her acting a "trance [that] captivates and intoxicates her audience." Her Cio-Cio-San impressed and inspired a local soprano, Irén Szecsődi, who recalled: "It was a wonderful performance! It was then that I first felt that I was experiencing the same thing in myself as a stage character interpreted by an excellent artist."

The Țurcanus stopped in Allied-occupied Austria during September 1946. Lucia again attracted notice, with another Tosca—now with Ludwig Kaufmann as conductor. Eduard Herzog of the Weltpresse called hers "the only bright spot in an otherwise insignificant production". Herzog adds: "Charming in appearance, perhaps a little too impersonal, but tasteful in her acting, [Bercescu-Țurcanu] made an excellent impression." Later that month, she gave a recital alongside the Vienna Symphony (with Constantin as conductor). In Das Kleine Volksblatt, composer Kurt Schmidek declared this her second Viennese success of that season, noting her "magnificent voice and powerful dramatic impact", and observing that she had to perform an encore.

The Țurcanus returned to Bucharest (where their address was recorded as 12 Coriolan Street), but then opted to emigrate due to the political shifts occurring in Romania. Their initial destination was Italy. At home, Răutu could still discuss Bercescu-Țurcanu's indignant and hurried departure (which included her husband selling the family piano). He sarcastically thanked the RNOB for ensuring that she found no venue for her talents at home, and compared her to sculptor Constantin Brâncuși, who had similarly been enraged into leaving Romania. In July 1947, Bercescu-Țurcanu was formally sacked from the RNOB, as part of a wave of "workforce reductions" (comprimări).

As "Lucia Turcano" (Note: Bercescu-Țurcanu adopted the italianized version of her name Lucia Turcano, a name which, in 1947, puzzled Romanian opera fans, who did not immediately recognize it. According to scholar Michael La Sorte, foreign opera singers working in Italy in this period of time would often Italianize their name at the behest of opera managers. These singers also adopted Italian traits of speech and mannerisms in order to overcome prejudice against foreign singers that could hinder a career on the Italian stage. The exact reasons for Bercescu-Țurcanu's adoption of the stage name Turcano are not addressed in the literature.) she appeared frequently at La Scala in Milan from 1946 to 1949. Her husband was a conductor at the same institution in this period. She made her Milan debut as Abigaille in Verdi's Nabucco for the opening of the 1946–1947 season. During that period, she was colleagues with Gabriella Relle, who spoke of her "great success [as Ponchielli's] Gioconda at the only charity summer performance at La Scala." Bercescu-Țurcanu was active in the newly formed Italian Republic's other major opera houses, achieving acclaim on Italian stages in the title roles of Aida, Bellini's Norma, Tosca and Puccini's Turandot. More than a decade later, musicologist Giorgio Gualerzi spoke of her as one of the great Turandots, proposing that the role had been conceived as so restrictive that Italian and Western venues in general "could [only] confidently focus on imports".

During early 1948 Bercescu-Țurcanu was in Switzerland, being employed by Lausanne Municipal Theater for another production of Tosca. Some of the other theaters she worked for included La Fenice in Venice, the Teatro di San Carlo in Naples, and the Teatro Comunale di Bologna. She also performed at the Baths of Caracalla for the Teatro dell'Opera di Roma summer opera season, and at theaters in Cagliari, Cremona, Palermo, and Turin, among others. Sometime just prior to a move to the United States she gave a concert tour of South America and Central America with her husband.

== Career in the United States ==
Bercescu-Țurcanu and her husband were brought to the United States by opera impresario Alfredo Salmaggi; arriving in New York City from Milan on September 29, 1949. They had temporary visas, but were determined to remain in the United States and become American citizens rather than live under the oppressive regime of the since-established Romanian People's Republic. Lucia made her American debut as Aida at the Brooklyn Academy of Music (BAM) on October 8, 1949, with her husband as conductor and tenor Eddy Ruhl as Radamès. On the American stage Lucia was still billed with the Italianized version of her name, Lucia Turcano.

Bercescu-Țurcanu also performed the roles of Cio-Cio-San and Tosca with Salmaggi's company at BAM with former Metropolitan Opera baritone Claudio Frigerio as Sharpless and Scarpia. She toured with the Salmaggi Opera Company to the Newark Opera House. Her other role with that troupe, in 1949, was Santuzza in Mascagni's Cavalleria rusticana; Richard Torigi was Alfio. In March 1950 Bercescu-Țurcanu signed a contract with the New York City Opera (NYCO) at the invitation of Laszlo Halasz. She made her debut with the NYCO the following month as Turandot. Later that year she sang Aida with the NYCO. In October 1950 Bercescu-Țurcanu appeared at the Philadelphia Academy of Music with the Philadelphia La Scala Opera Company, again as Gioconda. She performed with Fortune Gallo's San Carlo Opera Company at the Boston Opera House in November 1950. In February 1951 she returned to Philadelphia to sing Aida to Francesco Battaglia's Radamès. She also sang Violetta in La traviata at Carnegie Hall.

Lucia's husband, Constantin Țurcanu, was also a priest in the Romanian Orthodox Church. He was ordained in Detroit, Michigan in 1950. In 1951 the couple moved to Terre Haute, Indiana where her husband accepted a position as a minister. In October 1951 Lucia performed three Romanian songs at the Terre Haute House at an event featuring Princess Ileana of Romania as the honored speaker during her exile in the United States. Sometime in the winter months of 1952–1953 her husband was appointed priest of St. Nicholas Romanian Orthodox Church in Worcester, Massachusetts (congregation is now in new premises in Shrewsbury).

Lucia assisted her husband in his ministry and worked as a voice teacher in Worcester. In March 1954 she gave a recital at Atwood Hall on the campus of Clark University. That same month American congressman Harold Donohue introduced a bill to the United States Congress granting citizenship to Bercescu-Țurcanu and her husband. The bill passed and was signed by American president Dwight D. Eisenhower; making Lucia and Constantin American citizens. An earlier bill introduced by Franklin D. Roosevelt Jr. in 1950 failed, and other Americans assisted them to prevent their deportation in the intervening years.

By September 1956 Lucia was living in Detroit when she performed three opera arias as a guest performer at the 33rd annual convention of the National Association of Negro Musicians. She worked as a voice teacher in Detroit at the Art Center Music School. In October 1956 she was the featured soprano soloist at the Reformation Festival organized by the Detroit Council of Churches with 725 different congregations participating. In December 1957 she was a guest soloist in a Christmas concert with the Fitzgerald A Capella Choir which was filmed for television broadcast on CKLW-TV. She continued to perform periodically as a guest soloist at church music events in Detroit until as late as April 1960.

== Romanian return and final decades ==
In September 1960, during a thawing period in US–Romanian relations, a delegation of Romanian scientists, led by Ilie G. Murgulescu, visited Chicago. Bercescu-Țurcanu provided the entertainment, performing samples of Romanian folk music. In 1963, she returned permanently to Romania, giving a recital at the Bucharest Atheneum in October 1964. Her various concerts included one with the Iași Philharmonic, in March 1966. Here, she sang one of her husband's doine. Writing a year later, musicologist Viorel Cosma openly referred to her years abroad, as part of a wider claim that "the playbills of lyrical theaters across Europe, Africa, and the Americas have lived under the mirage of brilliant Romanian singers."

Widowed in November 1973, Bercescu-Țurcanu resumed performing at the RNOB, but only after being forced to go through an intensive screening process. In addition to giving further performances at that theatre, she sang at the Romanian National Opera, Cluj-Napoca and the Romanian National Opera, Iași while concurrently teaching. In early 1979, Electrecord released an LP of arias, featuring Bercescu-Țurcanu and Mircea Buciu—described by the Săptămîna columnist, Cristian Mihăilescu, as "two unique voices", which were thus rendered immortal. She also worked as a concert soprano in theatres in Craiova, Bacău, Sibiu, and Oradea. Her career ended when she was banned from the stage by the communist censorship apparatus, though her name still appeared in print: in a 1986 interview, baritone David Ohanesian declared her one of the Romanians who belonged to "the golden patrimony of European soloists." In 1992, some two years after the fall of communism, the Union of Romanian Composers and Musicologists (Uniunea Compozitorilor și Muzicologilor din România) honored her with the Mihail Jora Prize for a life "dedicated to art".

Bercescu-Țurcanu died in Bucharest on June 26, 1995, at the age of 84. She was posthumously honored by the Romanian Union of Music Critics at its awards gala in February 1996. The RNOB dedicated the company's 2003 album, Arta cântului, to her. Composer Doru Popovici was one of three contributing authors to the monograph Binecuvântarea cântului (2005, Editura Amurg Sentimental) on Bercescu-Țurcanu. It was accompanied by a DVD.

== Notes and references ==
=== Bibliography ===
- La Sorte, Michael (2010). La Merica: Images Of Italian Greenhorn Experience. Temple University Press. ISBN 9781439903926.
- Kutsch, K. J.; Riemens, Leo (2003). "Bercescu-Țurcanu, Lucia". In Rost, Hansjörg (ed.). Grosses Sängerlexikon. K. G. Saur Verlag. ISBN 9783598440885.
