= Maia Ciobanu =

Romanian composer and music educator

Maia Ciobanu (born 5 May 1952) is a Romanian composer and music educator. She is also the author of books, studies and papers on music.

== Early years ==
Maia Ciobanu was born in Bucharest and studied at the Conservatory Ciprian Porumbescu. She studied composition with Dan Constantinescu and Myriam Marbe and piano with Aurora Ienei, and also studied with Ștefan Niculescu, Mircea Chiriac, Liviu Comes, and Aurel Stroe. In 1980 she attended the Darmstadt summer courses, and studied composition with Brian Ferneyhough, Gérard Grisey, Wolfgang Rihm, Hans Peter Haller, Włodzimierz Kotoński, and Tristan Murail. In 1995, she studied at the Swedish Academy of Music in Gothenburg.

== Career ==
Since 1992 Ciobanu has been musical director of the Group for Alternative Contemporary Music. In 1993 she became a professor at the Caragiale National University of Theatre and Film, and has taught courses on contemporary Romanian music at music academies in Gothenburg (1995) and Cologne (1996), at the Pedagogical College of Rorschach (1997), and the University of St. Gallen in Switzerland (2000).

Ciobanu won Honorable Mention at the "International Composition Contest – Mannheim GEDOK" in Germany (1981), the Romanian Academy "George Enescu Prize" (1998), the Romanian Composers' Association Prize (1999, 2022) and "The Order for Cultural Achievements" medal (2004).

Ciobanu was president of the Romanian Section of the International Society for Contemporary Music between 2002 and 2003, and is the founder and editor of the English-language journal Contemporary Music – Romana Newsletter of the section. Ciobanu is also active in publishing and produces music programs for Romanian radio. She is a member of the Romanian Composers Union, the International League of Women Composers, the International Computer Music Association and the Société des auteurs, compositeurs et éditeurs de musique .

== Selected works ==
- Sonata for clarinet, piano and percussion, 1974
- Pămîntul trebuie să Trăiască for orchestra, 1975
- Since Suonare for piano, 1976
- Întilnire cu o altă melody for percussion and tape, 1978
- Prelude for clarinet, guitar and trombone, 1980
- Concerto for violin and orchestra, 1980
- Trei Sculpturi for string quartet, 1981
- Toamna, Madrigal for mixed choir to words by Ioan Nicolae Stănescu, 1981
- Portret, Madrigal for mixed choir to words by Emil Botta, 1982
- Pădurencele for nai, 1982
- Decor I for clarinet and piano, 1983
- Decembrie în Ardel for mixed choir, organ and drums on verses by Petru *Anghel, 1983
- Dorul – Dor, Madrigal for mixed choir to words by Lucian Blaga, 1984
- Decor II for flute and piano, 1984
- Fîntîna I for organ and percussion, 1985
- Fîntîna II for cello and organ, 1986
- Urare de Belşug for female choir, 1986
- De Dor for women's choir, 1986
- Sorcova Peste de Vara for female choir, 1986
- Povestea Vorbii, Chortryptichon for mixed choir to poems by Anton Pann, 1987
- Decor III for clarinet, piano and synthesizer, 1988
- Symphony No. 1 – Jurnal '88, 1988
- 3 Ostinato I for percussion and tape, 1989
- Doina, Doinna, Cintec dulce, 1989
- Concerto for piano and tape, 1990
- Incidental music for Merlin of Tancred Dorst for electronic music, 1991
- Veni-va! for tape, 1992
- Fîntîna III for piano, synthesizer and percussion, 1992
- Valsul Pelicanului for choir, flute, 2 pianos and percussion on verses by Robert Desnos, 1992
- Comentarii for clarinet, piano, synthesizer and percussion, 1993
- Radical political change descompus sau Drumul catr Centru, ballet, 1993
- Eu, Nu, Ballet, 1994
- Ostinato II for trombone, clarinet, piano and percussion, 1995
- STII Episodul tu în care ... for flute, violin, viola and accordion, 1997
- Invizabila Struna for violin, 1998
- Concerto for percussion and tape, 1998
- Jurnal'99 for tape, 1999
- Autoportret for violin, cello and piano, 2000
- Tacere cu Variaţiuni for clarinet, trombone, violin, cello, piano and percussion, 2000
- Decor V for 2 flutes and nai, 2000
- Decor IV for clarinet and viola (2003)
- Pian excessive for tape, 2003
- Medium I for tape, 2003
- Pădurencele for chorus to words by Emil Botta, 2003
- Pian excessive II for piano, actors and tape, 2004
- Concerto for clarinet and string orchestra, 2004
- Muzica Alternative I, II, III and electronic media, piano and dancers, 2005
- Symphony No. 2, 2006
- 3 comentarii for ensemble, 2006
- Climate for tape, 2006
- NR.273,16: Intersecţii (Crossroads) for saxophone, viola and live electronics (2007)

== Discography ==
Ciobanu's recorded work includes:

- The Earth Must Live
- Ostinato II
- Da Suonare
- The Invisible String
- Concerto
- Journal '99
- It Shall Come!
- Symphony i Journal '88, Three Sculptures for String Quartet, Journal '99 for violin and tape
