= Carmen Petra Basacopol =

Romanian composer and music teacher (1926–2023)

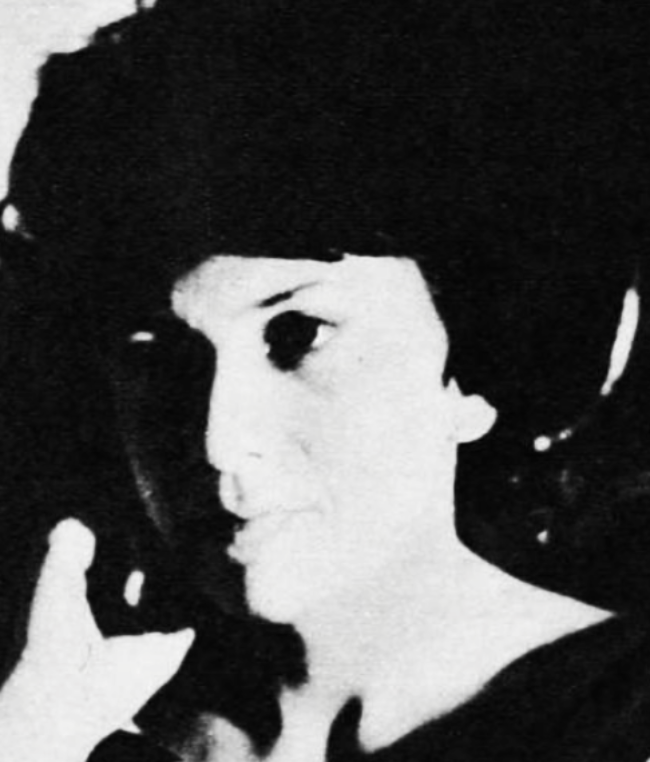
- Petra Basacopol in 1970
- Born: Carmen Petra; 5 September 1926; Sibiu, Romania
- Died: 15 October 2023 (aged 97)
- Education: Bucharest Conservatory of Music; Sorbonne University
- Occupations: Composer; Musicologist; Academic teacher
- Organizations: National University of Music Bucharest; Rabat Conservatoire
- Awards: George Enescu Prize

Carmen Petra Basacopol (5 September 1926 – 15 October 2023) was a Romanian composer, pianist, musicologist and academic teacher. She taught at the National University of Music Bucharest, between 1962 and 2003, and at the Rabat Conservatoire in Morocco in the 1970s. As a musicologist, she achieved a PhD from the Sorbonne University in Paris in 1976, with a dissertation about three Romanian composers who had influenced her, George Enescu, Mihail Jora and Paul Constantinescu, composers representing essential features of Romanian music.

She composed music of many genres, with a focus on chamber music, including compositions with the harp; her works have been performed internationally. Her music has been described as stylistically diversified, "defined by the freshness of inspiration, the elegance of construction and the ability to communicate directly with the listener through the simplicity of melodic and harmonic expression".

== Biography ==
Petra Basacopol was born Carmen Petra in Sibiu on 5 September 1926. She had family homes in both Sibiu and Câmpia Turzii; her mother, Clementina, was a graduate of the Timișoara Municipal Conservatory, who encouraged her to take up visual arts (her first and lasting passion), as well as piano—which Carmen studied from the age of five. Though she received a diploma (presented to her by composer Sabin Drăgoi) during a national music festival, she focused on literature, and, from 1946, took up formal studies in philosophy at the University of Bucharest. She graduated in 1949. She was then enrolled at the Bucharest Conservatory of Music, graduating in 1956. Her professors included Ioan D. Chirescu (music theory), Leon Klepper, and Mihail Jora (composition), Paul Constantinescu (harmony) and Tudor Ciortea (musical analysis), Nicolae Buicliu (counterpoint), Theodor Rogalski (orchestration), Ion Vicol and Ion Marian (choral conducting), Adriana Sachelarie and George Breazul (music history), Tiberiu Alexandru and Emilia Comișel (folklore), and Silvia Căpățână and Ovidiu Drimba (piano).

Petra debuted as a composer at this stage, contributing a series of rondos and suites, before moving on to sonatas and symphonies inspired by her direct experience of peasant life in Țara Moților and Crișana. She took an award at the 3rd World Festival of Youth and Students in East Berlin, 1951. In 1953, she won the George Enescu prize of the Romanian Academy. She was awarded at the 4th World Festival of Youth and Students, held in Bucharest in 1953, then at the 5th edition, held in Warsaw in 1955. The Mannheim Hochscule presented her with a special prize for composition in 1961.

Petra became teaching assistant at the Bucharest Conservatory in 1962, later becoming lecturer (1966–1972); by 1965, she had been included on the steering committee of the Union of the Composers and Musicologists of Romania (UCMR), and was regularly featured with articles in the trade magazine, Muzica. She also attended classes at the Darmstädter Ferienkurse in 1968, with György Ligeti, Erhard Karkoschka, Günther Becker, Christoph Caskel, Saschko Gawriloff, and Aloys Kontarsky. She then taught harmony, counterpoint, music history and improvisation at the conservatory of Rabat, Morocco, between 1974 and 1976.

Petra Basacopol received her PhD in musicology from the Sorbonne University in Paris in 1976, with a dissertation entitled "The Compositional Art of Great Romanian Composers: Enescu, Jora and Constantinescu", focused on three composers who had influenced her, Enescu and two of her teachers. She felt that these composers represented essential features of Romanian music, distinguishing it from other music.

Petra Basacopol then returned to Bucharest, teaching musical analysis and harmony at the Conservatory from 1976 to 2003. Petra Basacopol attended conferences, lectures, scientific communications in Romania and abroad (France, Angola, São Tomé and Príncipe). She authored research, published in trade journals and for Radio România Cultural. She was a jury member of the Harp Contest in Jerusalem in 1979, and of the Valentino Bucchi Composition contest in Rome in 1986. She repeatedly received the UCMR's annual prize—in 1974, 1979, 1981, 1985, 1987, 1999 and 2003. She was also awarded the George Enescu Prize of the Romanian Composers Academy in 1980, knighthood in the Order of Cultural Merit, and in 2017 the UCMR's Grand Prize for her life's achievements.

=== Personal life ===
Petra Basacopol was married to Alexandru Basacopol, a physician whom she met when attending a performance of Enescu's Œdipe in Bucharest. Their first child, a boy, was born in 1964. The Basacopols lived for a while in Rabat, where she founded a music school and gave piano lessons to children, also teaching at the conservatory. Their son Paul Basacopol became a singer at the Romanian National Opera, Bucharest.

Petra Basacopol died on 15 October 2023, at age 97.

== Works ==
Petra Basacopol composed for orchestra, opera, chamber ensemble, harp, piano, voice, and ballet performance, often using themes and instruments from folk music. Among more than 80 opuses, chamber music has a special place, especially music for the harp. She expanded the expression of the harp, typically associated with delicacy and transparency, by aggressive and strident sonorities, by hammering on the wood, playing close to the table, glissandos and syncopated rhythms, with "archaic sounds" used to "translate inner movements of the soul".

Her works include:

=== Theatre music ===
- 1970 – Fata și masca, Op. 32, ballet
- 1980 – Miorița, Op. 47, ballet after a libretto by Oleg Danovski
- 1983 – Inimă de copil (A Child's Heart), Op. 52, opera for children in two acts after the book of the same name by Edmondo De Amicis
- 1986–1987 – Ciuleandra, Op. 54, ballet in two acts after Liviu Rebreanu
- 1988–1990 – Apostol Bologa, Op. 58, opera in two acts after Rebreanu's Pădurea spânzuraţilor (Forest of the Hanged)
- 1995–1996 – Cei șapte corbi (The Seven Ravens), Op. 73, ballet for children

=== Vocal-symphonic music ===
- 1966 – Crengile, Op. 26, vision for moving choir and orchestra
- 1966 – Moartea căprioarei, Op. 27, ballad for strings orchestra, clarinet, piano, percussion and solo baritone
- 1967 – Un cântec despre jertfe mari și despre lumină, Op. 28, cantata
- 1970 – Pulstio vitae, Op. 33, for harp, clarinet, xylophone, bells, percussion and moving choir

=== Symphonic music ===
- 1956 – Symphony, Op. 6
- 1959 – Symphonic Suite "Țară de piatră", Op. 13
- 1961 – Piano Concerto, Op. 19
- 1962 – Symphonic Triptic, Op.20
- 1963 – Violin Concertino, Op. 21
- 1965 – Violin Concerto, Op 25
- 1975 – Concerto for Harp, String orchestra and Timpani, Op.40
- 1981 – Concerto for String Orchestra, Op. 49
- 1982 – Cello Concerto, Op. 51
- 1994 – Concerto for Flute and Chamber orchestra, Op. 71
- 1996 – Concerto for Harp and String orchestra "Rituale", Op. 75

=== Chamber music ===
- 1950 – Flute Suite, Op. 3
- 1952 – Cello Sonata, Op. 4
- 1954 – Violin Sonata, Op. 5
- 1957 – Three Sketches for oboe and piano, Op. 8, No. 2
- 1957 – Seven songs for soprano and piano, Op. 8, No. 1
- 1958 – Three Lieder for mezzo-soprano and piano, Op. 9, No. 1 / Three Lieder for soprano and piano, Op. 9, No. 2
- 1959 – Piano Trio, Op. 11
- 1959 – Lieder for mezzo-soprano and piano, Op. 12, No. 1 / Seasons for soprano and piano, Op. 12, No. 2
- 1960 – Images from Valea Crișului, Op. 16, No. 1, for harp and violin
- 1961 – Sonata for Flute and Harp, Op. 17
- 1961 – Three Lieder for soprano and piano, Op. 18, No. 1
- 1963 – Five Lieder for tenor and harp, Op. 22, No. 1
- 1964 – Nostalgia for baritone and English horn, Op. 23, No. 1
- 1964 – Opium Flower, Op. 23, No. 2, for baritone and piano
- 1965 – Two Lieder for soprano and piano, Op. 18, No. 2
- 1968 – Ofrnade, Op. 29, two lieder for soprano and piano
- 1969 – Divertimento for harp, wind quartet, double bass, and xylophone, octet, Op. 30
- 1971 – Two Lieder for bass and harp, Op. 22, No. 2 / Propas, Op. 34, three lieder for soprano, flute and piano
- 1972 – Elegy for violin and piano, Op. 35
- 1972 – Moments for trumpet and piano, Op. 36
- 1974 – Trio for flute, clarinet and bassoon, Op. 39
- 1976 – Cântece haiducești for baritone and piano, Op. 41, No.1
- 1977 – Acuarele argheziene, Op. 91, No. 2, two lieder for soprano and lion
- 1978 – Craiul munților, Op. 43, quartet for flute, violin, cello and piano / Moroccan Poems, Op. 42, three lieder for mezzo-soprano and wind quartet
- 1979 – Variations on a Macedonian-Romanian Theme, Op. 44, for harp and cello
- 1980 – Tablouri dacice, Op. 46, trio for pan flute, vibraphone and cello
- 1984 – Cântecele vieții, Op. 53, cycle of five lieder for soprano and piano
- 1987 – Trio, Op. 57, for flute, harp and clarinet / Sângele pământului, Op. 55, three lieder for bass and piano
- 1991 – Ecouri, Op. 63, for 2 harps
- 1991 – Triptych for pan flute and harp, Op. 64
- 1992 – Divertimento, Op. 67, for wind quintet
- 1993 – Imne, Op. 65, for soprano and piano / File de acatist for voice and flute (low voice and piano lieder), Op. 70
- 1994 – Musica per cinque, Op. 72, for flute, harp, violin, viola and cello
- 1996 – Songs of Exile, Op. 74, seven songs for soprano and piano
- 1998 – Triptych, Op. 79, for soprano and piano
- 1999 – Character Pieces, Op. 80, for oboe and piano
- 1999 – Lamaneto, Op. 82, for two flutes and percussion
- 2000 – Dramatic Sonata, Op. 83, for cello and piano / Psalms of David, Op. 84, five lieders for soprano and piano / Meșterul Manole, Op. 85, five lieders for soprano and piano
- 2001 – Viziuni dansante, Op. 86, for violin and piano / Naive paintings, Op. 91, for instrumental ensemble
- 2002 – Serenada, Op. 92, for four cellos / Fantasy, Op. 94, for horn in F and piano / Măiastra, Op. 95, for instrumental ensemble / Hymn II, Op. 93, four lieder for soprano and piano / Îngerul a strigat, Op. 96, three lieder for soprano and piano
- 2003 – Legandă, Op. 97, for violin and organ / Elegy, Op. 96, for harp and clarinet / Duo, Op. 100, for violin and viola / Cântece imaginare, Op. 99 for soprano and piano / Diptic bucovian, Op. 101 / Cântece naive pentru Nichita, Op.102 / Mărturisiri, Op. 104 for mezzo-soprano and piano
- 2004 – Piccolo Sonata, Op. 105, for flute, contralto flute in G and piano / Variațiuni pe o temă elegiacă, Op. 106, for two harps / Tristeți bacoviene, Op. 107, for low voice and piano

=== Choral music ===
- 1960 – Fetelor, surorilor, Op. 16, No. 2, for women's choir
- 1979 – Seasons, Op. 45, No. 2, for two-part children's choir
- 1980 – Salutul păcii, Op. 48, No. 2, for two-part women's choir
- 1992 – Psalmii, Op. 66, for mixed choir
- 2001 – Sacred Songs, for mixed a cappella choir

=== Instrumental music ===
- 1949 – Rondo for piano, Op. 2
- 1956 – 24 Imagini pitorești for piano, Op. 7
- 1958 – Solo harp Suite, Op. 10
- 1973 – Solo flute improvisation, Op. 37
- 1978 – Cinci miniaturi pentru copii, Op. 45, No. 1, for piano
- 1980 – Odă, Op. 48, No. 1, for double bass solo
- 1981 – Solo Cello Suite, Op. 50
- 1987 – Incantațiile pământului, Op. 56, for harp
- 1990 – Imagini europene, Op. 59, for harp / Prelude, Interlude and Postlude, Op. 60, for organ
- 1992 – The Jungle Book, Op. 61, seven pieces
- 1993 – Mica sirenă, Op. 69, for harp
- 1997 – Three Dances, Op 76, for harp
- 1998 – Seven Visions of the Prophet Ezechiel, Op. 78, for organ
- 2001 – Improvisations, Op. 87, for piano / Incantațions, Op. 88, for horn / Fantasy, Op. 89, for bassoon

== Recordings ==
Petra Basacopol's compositions were recorded first in Romania by Electrecord. In the 1960s, her Violin Concertino was recorded by soloist George Hamza and the Romanian Radio Studio Orchestra conducted by Ludovic Baci, ECE O404. Her Violin Concerto No. 2 was recorded in the 1970s, by soloist Ștefan Ruha and the Romanian Radio Orchestra conducted by Constantin Bobescu, combined with Dan Constantinescu's Concerto for Piano and String Orchestra, ECE 607.

A collection of her chamber music appeared in 1980, containing the Quartettino for Strings in neoclassical style, the Sonata for Flute and Harp, Colaje for brass quintet, and the Violin Sonata, ST-ECE 01545. Her Concertino for Harp, String Orchestra and Timpani was recorded in 1983, together with the Harp Concerto by Paul Constantinescu, played by soloist Elena Ganţolea and the Romanian Radio Orchestra conducted by Iosif Conta, ST-ECE 1862. In 1990, her Cello Concerto was recorded by soloist Marin Cazacu and the George Enescu Philharmonic Orchestra conducted by Cristian Mandeal, along with the suite from the ballet Ciuleandra, played by the Romanian Radio Orchestra conducted by Modest Cichirdan, ST-ECE 03736.

Her Sonata for Flute and Harp was recorded for BIS as part of a collection of music for the two instruments, entitled Toward the Sea, played by Robert Aitken and Erica Goodman, and released in 1995.
