= Viorel Cosma =

Romanian musician and teacher

- Born: 30 March 1923; Timișoara, Greater Romania
- Died: 15 August 2017 (aged 94); Bucharest, Romania
- Education: Universitatea Națională de Muzică București
- Occupations: Musicologist; Music critic Lexicographer; Teacher-musician author

Viorel Cosma (30 March 1923 – 15 August 2017) was a Romanian musician and teacher who came to wider prominence as an exceptionally prolific musicologist and a pioneering lexicographer. Through his scholarship he also achieved distinction as a teacher, researcher and music critic. Between 1989 and 2012 he produced a ten volume lexicon, running to 2,800 pages, entitled "Muzicieni din România", providing extensive information on approximately 1,500 Romanian composers and musicians, musicologists, music critics, music teachers, folklorists and other contributors to Romanian music and musicianship.

== Biography ==
Viorel Cosma was born at Timișoara, the multi-ethnic economic and administrative capital of Banat, in the western part of the recently expanded Kingdom of Romania. In 1929, despite being just 6, he was accepted as a pupil at the Timișoara Municipal Music Conservatory, where for the next two years he learned to play the violin. He was taught by the violinist Eugen Cuteanu, while Sabin Drăgoi took care of the necessary Solfège and other aspects of music theory knowledge.

Cosma was 18 in 1940/41 when Romania became entangled in the war. He fought for his country in a guards regiment and was seriously wounded twice. His status as a war veteran would remain unpublicised and unknown for more than half a century, but during the final decade of his life, official and public attitudes towards Romania's role in the war grew more nuanced. He became a regular participant at events arranged by the Ministry of Defence to honour surviving war heroes, even taking part in television shows involving war veterans. In 2015, two years before he died, he was promoted to the rank of General (retired).

Back in 1945, after the war ended he progressed his music education between 1945 and 1950 at the National University of Music in Bucharest. Here he was taught by a number of Romania's leading composer-performers and musicologists, including Mihail Jora, Leon Klepper, Marțian Negrea, Constantin Silvestri, George Georgescu, Ion Dumitrescu, Dimitrie Cuclin and Zeno Vancea.

Between 1945 and 1947 he taught at the "Alberto della Pergola" conservatory in Bucharest. Later, still in Bucharest, he taught at the "Dinu Lipatti" and "George Enescu" musical secondary schools. At the university level he also taught, between 1951 and 1966, at the National University of Music and the Hyperion University. Meanwhile, he had already embarked on an intensive parallel career as a critic. Several sources state that in the Romanian and foreign press, in the end, he published over 5,000 essays, studies, articles, reviews and other pieces of music criticism. He delivered academic papers and contributed fully in various other ways at many of the symposia and conferences devoted to musicology, both in Europe and in the United States, at which he participated.

Viorel Cosma was also one of three co-librettists for Gherase Dendrino's 1954 operetta "Lăsați-mă să cânt!" ("Let me sing!"). The piece enjoyed official backing. Translated into Russian and several of the principal languages of middle Europe, it was staged in Romania, Germany, the Soviet Union, Austria, Bulgaria, Belgium and the Netherlands. More than half a century later many of Dendrino's are overlooked, but the central themes of "Lăsați-mă să cânt!" are relatively timeless: it was revived most recently at in 2018, at Cluj-Napoca.

As a musicologist Viorel Cosma published over 100 volumes, many of which appeared not just in Romanian, but in German, Russian, English, Bulgarian and Japanese. His works were a combination of monographic, historiographic, lexicographic and epistolatory. There were works of music criticism, comparative musicology, study guides and anthologies. Of particular note, he produced no fewer than 14 books devoted to Romania's best known composer-polymath, George Enescu (in Romanian, English, Russian, Japanese and Bulgarian). Possibly more regularly consulted than some of these are his lexicons, "Compozitori și muzicologi români" ("Romanian composers and Musicologists",1965) and "Muzicieni români" ("Romanian Musicians", 1970). More formidable still was "Muzicieni din România", the ten volume lexikon, produced by Cosma between 1989 and 2012. This compilation, and "Interpreți din România" ("Romanian Performers"), which he published in 1996, won for Viorel Cosma international recognition. At the time of his death he was engaged in producing a monumental fifteen volume "Enciclopedia muzicii din România" of which the first two volumes ("A" and "B") had already been completed and appeared in book shops.

Viorel Cosma was a member of various professional associations and foundations, both inside Romania and beyond its borders. He was a member of the Georg Friedrich Händel Society in Halle, of the Basel-based International Musicological Society, the Music Research Association in Kassel, the Société française de musicologie in Paris and the Société Fryderyk Chopin in Warsaw.

== Evaluation ==
According to admirers, Viorel Cosma laid the groundwork of modern musical lexicography in Romania, creating the most extensive national lexicographic music exegesis anywhere in the world. His musicological research spans five centuries, between 1500 and 2000, discovering or rediscovering the names of hundreds of Romanian artists who made musical careers in Romania and/or abroad. As a Professor of Musicology, during the twentieth century he created and trained the first generation of Romanian musicologists and music critics, occupying for many years the first high-profile professorial chair at the National University of Music (as it became known) in Bucharest, following its reconfiguration, rebranding and relaunch. Inspired by his involvement in the folk music revival, which emerged with particular force in Romania during the first half of the twentieth century, Cosma played a central role in rediscovering connections between Romanian tradition and the more widespread music cultures of and beyond the European continent: he is credited with having identified more than 100 non-Romanian works inspired by Romanian folklore.

A particular specialism in respect of Cosma's own researches was the life and works of the composer George Enescu. It was indeed in part a reflection of Enescu's own international profile that Cosma travelled abroad on various occasion to deliver lectures on the Romanian composer, notably in France and in the United States. Venues included the Académie des Beaux-Arts and the Sorbonne in Paris, along with Boston University in Massachusetts. He also shared his specialisms in some of the western world's leading music lexicons and encyclopædias, contributing to "Grove's Dictionary", "Die Musik in Geschichte und Gegenwart", the "Dictionnaire des interprètes et de l'interprétation musicale au XXe " of Alain Pâris, "Sohlmans musiklexikon" and other major publications with similar aspirations.

== Celebration and recognition (selection) ==
- Viorel Cosma was a recipient of the "Premiile Academiei Române" (award) in 1974
- He received the "Artisjus [international music critics' Award] Prize" in 1984.
- In 1998 Viorel Cosma accepted a Doctorate in Musicology from the Bucharest Universitatea Națională de Muzică.
- He holds a "Doctor Honoris Causa" from the Arts Institute of Chișinău, in Moldova.
- Viorel Cosma received awards from the "Uniunea Compozitorilor și Muzicologilor din România" ("Union of Composers and Musicologists") no fewer than ten times.
- Viorel Cosma's state honours included the Order of the Crown, the Order of the Star of Romania and the Order of Artistic Merit (Grand Officer).
- Viorel Cosma became a corresponding member of the Rome-based "Pontifical Tiberina Academy" in January 2004.
- Viorel Cosma was created a "Cetățean de onoare" (honoured citizen) of his birth city, Timișoara.

== Output (selection) ==
- Lăsați-mă să cânt, operetă de Gherase Dendrino, partitură pentru voce și pian – 1954
- Brav ostaș la datorie, colecție de cântece de Constantin Costoli – 1957;
- Ciprian Porumbescu (1853–1883) – 1957
- George Fotino – 1958
- Maiorul I. Ivanovici – 1958
- Figuri de lăutari – 1960
- Cununa Sânzienelor, operetă în două acte, libretul de I.U. Soricu și Viorel Cosma, muzica de Ion Borgovan – 1962
- Cântăreața Elena Teodorini – 1962
- Compozitori și muzicologi români: mic lexicon – 1965
- Un maestru al muzicii corale – Ion Vidu – 1965
- Nicolae Filimon – Critic muzical și folclorist – 1966
- Teodor Burada – Viața în imagini – 1966
- Teatrul muzical din Galați 1956–1966 – 1966
- Constantin Ghiban. Cânta la Stupea o vioară. Roman, îngrijire de ediție și prefață – 1961
- Filarmonica "George Enescu" din Bucuresti: 1868–1968 – 1968
- Mărturii ale istoriei locale în muzeele din județul Ilfov – 1969
- Muzicieni români – lexicon – 1970
- Corul Madrigal al Conservatorului – 1971
- Istoria învățământului din România – Compendiu, sub redacția acad. prof. dr. docent Constantin C. Giurescu – 1971
- Istoria muzicii universale. Antichitatea (I) – 1972
- Ion St. Paulian. În lumina izvoarelor documentare – 1973
- Zece romanțe – Voce și pian – 1974
- George Enescu. Scrisori – 1974 (vol. I); 1981 (vol. II)
- Bartok Bila levelei (Corespondența lui Bela Bartok), Budapesta, Zenemukiado Vallalat, 1955; idem în Bartok Bela levelei, ediție îngrijită de Demeny Janos, Budapesta, Zenemukiado, 1976, idem în Scrisori, ediție îngrijită și adnotată de Ferenc Laszlo, traducerea textelor de Gemma Zinveliu – 1976 (vol. I), 1977 (vol. II)
- Două milenii de muzică pe pământul României – 1977; idem în limba germană, 1980
- Dicționar cronologic al științei și tehnicii universale, coordonator: acad. Ștefan Bălan – 1979
- De la „Cântecul Zaverei” la Imnurile unității naționale: contributii la istoria cîntecului patriotic : (1821–1918) – 1978
- Stranitski Istorii Românskoi Muziki (Pagini din istoria muzicii românești) – coordonator Rufina Leites, Moscova; capitolele: Barbu Lăutarul, Nicolae Picu, Christache Ciolac, Grigoraș Dinicu – 1979
- România muzicală – 1981
- Pascal Bentoiu.În "The New Grove Dictionary of Music and Musicians", Londra, Macmillan – 1980
- Enescu azi: premise la redimensionarea personalității și operei – 1981
- Romanian Musical Acouslics. Brief historical overvieio Achivements, îngrijire de ediție și studiul Original romanian contributions to musical acoustics and organology – 1981
- A concise history of romanian music – 1982
- Dimitrie Cuclin. Corespondență. O istorie polemică a muzicii, pe marginea corespondenței Doru Popovici – Dimitrie Cuclin – 1983
- Interferenzen in der Musik: Studien und Aufsätze – 1984
- Florile copilăriei: versuri pentru toți copiii – 1984
- Anotimp de lumină: [poezii] – 1984
- Exegeze muzicologice (I) – 1984
- București – monografie], coordonatori: Nicolae Croitoru și Dumitru Târcob – 1985
- Dintre toate iubirile: versuri – 1986
- 40 de ani în fotoliul de orchestră – eseuri, studii, cronici muzicale (1946–1976) – 1986
- Nicolae Bretan. 16 Lieduri pe versuri de Mihai Eminescu – 1986 (ediție în limbile română și engleză)
- Dirijorul George Georgescu: mărturii în contemporaneitate : texte și documente – 1987
- Muzicieni din România – Lexicon vol. I (A-C) – 1989
- Eminescu. Un veac de nemurire, album alcătuit de Victor Crăciun, capitolul Eminescu și muzica, vol. II – 1991
- L'Athénée Roumain. Un symbole de la culture roumaine (ed. trilingvă) – 1991
- George Enescu: cronica unei vieți zbuciumate – 1991
- Dinu Lipatti: cronica unei vieți tragice – 1992
- Lăutarii de ieri și de azi ed. II – 1996
- Dirijori, cântareti, instrumentiști, regizori – 1996
- Interpreți din România: lexicon bio-bibliografic, vol. I (A-F) – 1996
- Marte și Euterpe: muzica și armata : eseuri, studii, cronici muzicale : (1946–1996) – 1996
- Martin Opitz: Zlatna sau Cumpăna Dorului, traducere de Mihai Gavril, postuma Viorel Cosma – 1997
- Un surprinzător concert al tinerelor talente lirice – 1997
- Panoramic România – album, coordonator editorial Dumitru Ioncică, capitolul Muzică, București – 1998 (ediția I); 1999 (ediția II); ediție trilingvă (română, franceză și engleză)
- Enciclopedia marilor personalități din istoria, știința și cultura românească de-a lungul timpului, coordonator Ion Văduva-Poenaru (9 schițe monografice) – 1998
- Sergiu Celibidache – Concertul de adio – 1998
- Dirijorul Eizio Massini – 1998
- George Enescu. Un suflet românesc în universalitate – 1998
- Muzicieni din România – Lexicon vol. II – 1999
- Portrete sentimentale – Petre Ștefănescu-Goangă – 1999
- George Enescu: a tragic life in pictures – 2000
- Muzicieni din România – Lexicon vol. III – 2000
- Eminescu în universul muzicii – 2000
- Eseuri, exegeze și documente enesciene – 2001
- Muzicieni din România – Lexicon vol. IV – 2001
- Muzicieni din România – Lexicon vol. V – 2002
- George Enescu – un portret lexicografic – 2003
- George Enescu în memoria timpului – evocări, amintiri, însemnări memorialistice – 2003
- Muzicieni din România – Lexicon vol. VI – 2003
- Oedipe de George Enescu. Dosarul premierelor 1936–2003 – 2004
- Muzicieni din România – Lexicon vol. VII – 2004
- Muzicieni din România – Lexicon vol. VIII – 2005
- George Enescu – Concertul de adio – 2005
- George Enescu – un muzician român singular – An Outstanding Romanian Musician – 2005
- Enciclopedia muzicii românești de la origini până în zilele noastre – 2005
- Muzicieni din România – Lexicon vol. IX – 2006
- Istoria muzicilor militare – 2006
- 60 de ani în loja Operei: cronici muzicale de operă, operetă, musical, balet – Vol. 1–2, 2007–2008
- București, citadela seculară a lăutarilor români: (1550–1950) : cârciumi, birturi, bodegi și restaurante, racherii și berării, parcuri și grădini cu muzica, dinastii de lăutari – 2009
- Dirijorul Marin Constantin – Portret eseistic – 2011
- 100 portrete sentimentale – vol. 1 – 2011
- De la Cantemir și Enescu până la Lipatti și Ursuleasa – Copiii-minune ai muzicii românești (1673–2013) – 2013
- 125 – Ateneul Român în oglinda istoriei... – 2015
- George Enescu. Muzicianul de geniu în imagini – George Enescu. The musical genius in pictures – Le musicien de génie en images, selecția, introducerea și legendele fotografiilor de Viorel Cosma – 2015
- Florilegiu enescian – 2016
- Enciclopedia muzicii românești – Vol 1:(A-B); vol. 2 (B) – 15 vol.(2005 -)
