= Irina Odagescu =

Romanian music educator and composer (born 1937)

Irina Odăgescu-Țuțuianu (23 May 1937) is a Romanian music educator and composer. She was a professor at the Bucharest Conservatory, and won the Romanian Composers' Union Prize and in 2001 the Romanian Academy's George Enescu Prize. She was also awarded the Italian prize the Viotti-Valesia Prize, and the ‘Ciudad Ibague’ Silver Medal from Columbia, and the IGNM prize at the World Days of Music in Graz.

== Biography ==
Irina Odăgescu was born on 23 May 1937 in Bucharest, and studied at the Bucharest Music Conservatoire, graduating in 1963. She studied with Alfred Mendelsohn (composition), Tudor Ciortea (musical form), Paul Constantinescu (harmony), Ioan Chirescu (theory) and Alexandru Pascanu (harmony). She also took summer courses with Miriam Marbe on counterpoint, Iannis Xenakis, György Ligeti, and Karlheinz Stockhausen. She also attended the international courses at Weimar and Darmstadt. After completing her studies, she spent a year as editor of Editions Musicales de Bucharest, and from 1965 to 1967 was a teacher at Art School N0. 5 in Bucharest. From 1967 she was a professor at the Bucharest Conservatoire.

Odăgescu's works have been performed internationally in Europe, Asia, and the United States, and she has lectured at international conferences held at the University of Pau in France and at the University of Alaska Fairbanks. She has co-written the texts Practical Studies for Reading in Keys for Two Voices in 1972, and Practical Studies for Reading in Old Choral Keys in 1982.

== Honors and awards ==
Awards and prizes won by Odăgescu include:

- The Romanian Union of Composers’ Prize (1978–2004)
- The Romanian Academy’s George Enescu Prize (2001)
- The Viotti- Valesia Prize (Italy, 1982)
- The ‘Ciudad Ibague’ Silver Medal (Columbia)
- IGNM prize at the World Days of Music in Graz (1982)

== Works ==
Odăgescu has composed symphonic, choral, ballet and chamber music. Selected works include:

- Youth Everlasting and Life Without End (2005)
- The Pyre of Bread
- Tall Song, Ballet
- Melos, Sonata for viola solo, Op.48 (1982)
