= Didia Saint Georges =

Maria Alexandra Saint Georges (24 September 1888 – 24 January 1979) was a Romanian composer, accompanist and pianist who was known as Didia Saint Georges. She won the Enescu Prize competition twice and knew George Enescu well.

== Life ==
Saint Georges was born in Botoșani, Romania in 1888. According to some sources, the house she lived in as a child is now a registered historic property, and has become the ethnography museum of Botosani. She studied solfege, harmony, counterpoint and theory of music at the Iași Conservatory (today the George Enescu National University of Arts) and the Leipzig Conservatory. Her teachers included Stephan Krehl, Enrico Mezzetti, Emil Paul, and Robert Teichmuller.

Saint Georges taught piano and worked as an accompanist in Botoșani, Iași and Bucharest, collaborating with Vasile Filip, Lisette Georgescu, Carlotta Leria, Nicolae Olmazu, Dimitrie Onofrei, and Constantin Stroescu. She composed 21 songs between 1908 and 1960, setting texts by German and Romanian poets such as Joseph Eichendorff, Mihai Eminescu, Octavian Goga, and Eduard Moricke to music. Her social circle included Luca Caragiale, Mariana Dumitrescu, Enescu, Mihail Jora, Oskar Kokoschka, and Alice Soare. Enescu commented that Saint Georges had "reliable and refined taste".

Saint Georges belonged to the Society of Romanian Composers. In 1929 and 1930, she won first place in the Enescu Prize competition; in 1943, she received an honorable mention. Saint Georges died in 1979 in Bucharest.

== Selected works ==
Saint Georges works include pieces for piano and voice:

=== Piano ===
- Concert Waltz for Two Pianos
- Illustrati Muzicale pe un Cintec Vechi Francez
- Romanian Suite, opus 4
- Sonatina, opus 6
- Three Ballet Waltzes, opus 7
- Twelve Variations on a Jewish Song, opus 3

=== Prose ===
- Enescu m'a Dit (Muzica 3/1993 [pp] 13-146 edited by Ileana Ratiu)

=== Vocal ===
- "Amurg" (text by Victor Tulbure)
- Four Songs, opus 1 (texts by Ștefan Octavian Iosif, Eminescu)
- Seven Romanian Folk Songs, opus 5
- Two Songs (text by Ricarda Huch)
- Vier Lieder (texts by Eichendorff, Biernbaum, and Moricke)
- "Ziorel de Ziuă" (text by Dumitrescu)
