= Christian Wilhelm Berger =

Romanian musician (born 1964)

- Born: 13 June 1964 (age 62); Bucharest
- Education: George Enescu Music School
- Occupation: Composer Organist Lecturer

Christian Wilhelm Berger (born 13 June 1964 in Bucharest) is a Romanian composer, organist, and a lecturer at the Bucharest Academy.

== Education ==
Berger studied piano at George Enescu Music School in Bucharest from 1970 to 1982. He studied composition at the Music Academy in Bucharest, with Prof. Aurel Stroe and Prof. Tiberiu Olah from 1983 to 1987, and received his Ph. D. at Gheorghe Dima Music Academy in Cluj-Napoca, with Cornel Țăranu in 1994. Berger privately studied the pipe organ with Ilse Maria Reich who was an organ player at a Lutheran Church in Bucharest, and with Eckart Schlandt, an organ player at the Black Church in Braşov.

Currently, Berger teaches orchestration and musical forms and analysis at the National Music University in Bucharest, and is the chef Department of Composition at the National Music University in Bucharest.

== Distinctions ==
Berger is a recipient of an Honor Diploma in 1989 at the Carl Maria von Weber International String Quartet Composition Competition, in Dresden, Germany for his String quartet no. 3, op. 9. In 1994, he took 2nd Prize at the Ernest Bloch International Composition Contest for String Orchestra in Lugano, Switzerland for "Cogito ergo sum…", and 3rd Prize at the Orgelmusik (organ music) 2000 International Composition Contest for the Organ in 1995 at Ingolstadt, Germany for Evocation for organ. Berger was awarded the George Enescu Prize of the Romanian Academy in 1995 for Inscription in Stone for organ.

== As an organist ==
Berger has performed numerous solo recitals in Romania (Bucharest, Braşov, Timișoara, Cluj-Napoca, Târgu-Mureş, etc.) and in Germany (Munich, Ingolstadt, Weinsberg, Augsburg, etc.) and concerts with orchestras in Romania with the George Enescu Philharmonic Orchestra, the National Broadcast Symphony Orchestra, and Philharmonic Orchestras from Craiova, Ploieşti, Bacău, and Târgu-Mureş.

== Compositions ==
- Symphony no. 1, op. 3, with organ (1987)
- Symphony no. 2, op. 11 (1989)
- Symphony no. 3, op. 12 (1990)
- Symphony no. 4, op. 15 (1993)
- String quartet no. 1, op. 2 (1986)
- String quartet no. 2, op. 6 (1987)
- String quartet no. 3, op. 9 (1988)
- Cogito ergo sum... for string orchestra, op. 16 (1994)
- Stanzas for organ, op. 1 (1986)
- Concert for solo organ, op. 5 (1987; Ed. Muzicala, Bucharest, 1992)
- Sonata for organ, op. 10 (1990)
- Invocation for organ, op. 13 (1991)
- Inscription in stone for organ, op. 14 (1993)
- Evocation for organ, op. 17 (1995)
- Sonata for three flutes, op. 4 (1987)
- Sonata for violin, op. 8, (1988)
- Prelude and passacaglia for clarinet and kettledrums (1986)

== Works of musicology ==
- Decaphonic modal model, in Muzica, nr.3, 1991
- Dynamic modal systems (Ph.D.Thesis)
- Franz Liszt at Bucharest and Iaşi
- The technical and expression characteristics of the modern orchestra instruments, National Music University, Bucharest, 2000
- The Organ, National Music University, Bucharest, 2014
