= Mihail Andricu =

Romanian composer, violinist and pianist (1894 - 1974)

Mihail Andricu (22 December 1894, Bucharest – 4 February 1974, Bucharest ) was a Romanian composer, violinist, and pianist. He studied with Alfonso Castaldi, Robert Klenck and Dumitru Kiriac. Andricu graduated from the National University of Music Bucharest (1903 to 1912), after which he studied with Gabriel Fauré (1913–1914) and Vincent d'Indy in Paris (1919–1922). From 1926 to 1948 he was a professor of chamber music and from 1948 to 1959 he was a professor of composition. Some of his students were Sergiu Natra, Ștefan Niculescu, Doru Popovici, and Aurel Stroe.

A co-founder of the Society of Romanian Composers, he was elected as a corresponding member of the Romanian Academy in 1948, member of the Société française de musicologie, and twice winner of the Enescu Prize, though his work was later suppressed by the government. Censor Leonte Răutu castigated Andricu for admitting or showing an appreciation for contemporary Western classical music. Andricu was expelled from the composers' union in 1959 and his mention was prohibited.

Highly prolific, Andricu composed eleven symphonies, thirteen sinfoniettas, and three chamber symphonies. Specific pieces include a symphonic suite: Cinderella.

== Honors ==
- Enescu Prize for composition (Op. 1) in 1923
- Enescu Prize for composition (Op. 2) in 1924
- Robert Cremer Prize in 1931
- Anhauch Prize in 1932
- Romanian Academy Award in 1949
