= Musicescu =

Musicescu is a Romanian surname. Notable people with the surname include:

- Florica Musicescu (1887–1969), Romanian pianist and musical pedagogue
- Gavriil Musicescu (1847–1903), Romanian composer, conductor and musicologist, father of Florica
