= Cristian Matei =

Romanian composer (born 1977)

Cristian Matei (born 8 May 1977) is a Romanian composer. Matei graduated from the National University of Music, Bucharest with a Master of Fine Arts in Jazz-Pop Music Composition. He is a member of Union of Composers and Musicologists from Romania.

== Film ==
- Dupa Ea, director Cristina Ionescu, 2007.
- Daca Îngerii ar putea vedea, director Mihnea Chelaru, 2009
- Black Sunday, director Mihnea Chelaru, 2010.
- La Frontieră, director Cătălin Dupu, 2010
- The 10nd, director Diana Grigoriu, 2011

== Theatre ==
- Amadeus by Peter Scheffer, director Toma Enache
- Female Sect, director Toma Enache
- England And Chicken Pox by D.R.Popescu, producer Vasile Manta.
- The Adventures Of Burattino, producer Vasile Manta.
- Donkey Skin, producer Vasile Manta.
- King-Limir, producer Leonard Popovici.
- Snow Girl, producer Vasile Manta.
- The Prince From Deep Within The Earth, producer Leonard Popovici.
- Snow White, musical by Puşa Roth.
- Barbiero Di Sevilla, producer Toma Enache.
- The Master Cat, musical by Puşa Roth.

== Projects ==
- Nobody Steals The Sun, science & music I.
- Perseids, science & music II.
