= Doru Popovici =

Romanian composer (1932–2019)

Doru Popovici

Ionel Doru Popovici (February 17, 1932 – March 5, 2019) was a Romanian composer, musicologist, writer and musical concerts manager.

== Biography ==
Ionel Doru Popovici was born in Reșița, Romania, a city close to the border of what was formerly Yugoslavia, now Serbia. His father was Ioan Popovici, a surgeon who was assassinated in 1959 in the Gherla political prison, accused of being an "Enemy of the Romanian State" because he helped write the Hungarian Counter-Revolution. His mother, Eugenia Popa, was the daughter of an Orthodox priest.

Popovici graduated from the Constantin Diaconovici Loga High School in Timișoara in 1950 and in the same year decided to pursue a musical career. He moved to Bucharest where he was admitted to the Ciprian Porumbescu Music Conservatory from which he graduated in 1955 with a degree in composition. Popovici studied under Mihail Andricu, Mihail Jora, Paul Constantinescu in harmony, Martian Negrea in counterpoint, Theodor Rogalski in instrumentation, and Zeno Vancea in music history.

In 1966, Popovici married Alina Musat, a music teacher, musicologist, and author of Ottorino Respighi, (Ed. Muzicala, 1972). Starting in 1968 Popovici made regular trips to Darmstadt, Germany, and studied modern composition technique with György Ligeti, Karlheinz Stockhausen, and Iannis Xenakis. He became an SACEM member, a French professional association that collects payments of artists' rights. In the same year he started working as a musical editor in the Romanian Radio Society. From 1970 to 1990 he was employed as a musical journalist by the Saptămîna newspaper, conducted by the writer Eugen Barbu. Since 1990 he has been a History of Music professor at Spiru Haret University in Bucharest.

== Music ==
Popovici's work can be divided into three stages: Post-Impressionism with works such as "The Piano Sonata" (edited at Leipzig, Ed. Peters), "The Violin and Piano Sonata", "Wires Quartet" and many lieds. The Serial Dodecaphonic, (he is the first Dodecaphonic composer in Romania), "Mariana Pineda", "Prometheus", "Homage to Palestrina", "The Pigeons of Death", "August Night", "Homage to Tuculescu" quintet (edited in Paris, Ed. Salabert), "Trio" (for violin, cello, piano), Symphony no. 1, 2 and "Homage to Eminescu" (Edited in Paris, Ed. Salabert); Post-Byzantine with the "Statornicie", "The Prostitute" operas, Symphony no.1, 2, Byzantine Poem, "Byzantine Hymns", "The Wedding" ballet, and "Codex Caioni".

== Books ==
Popovici wrote 33 books about the history of music, novels, musicians biography studies, and numerous poems using blank verse.

== Awards ==
- 20 Romanian Composers Union awards (1953–present)
- Pro Musica award (Budapest)
- The Yugoslavian Composers Society Prize
- The Romanian Academy Prize
- The "Tristan Tzara" medal
- "Comendattore d'Italia" title (1982)

== Listen ==
"Imn Bizantin", performed by Collegium Byzantinum, Aachen – Aix la Chapelle
