= Dinu Lipatti =

Romanian pianist and composer (1917–1950)

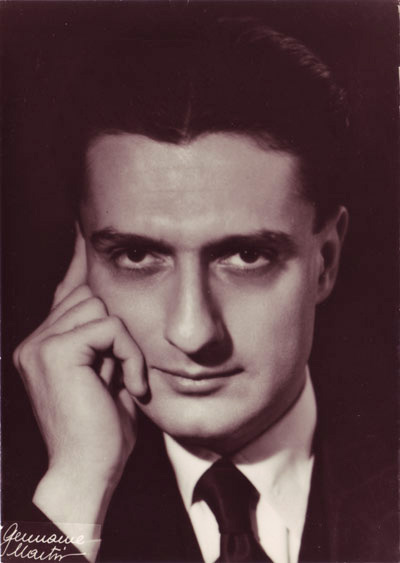
- Dinu Lipatti

Background information
- Born: Constantin Lipatti; 1 April [O.S. 19 March] 1917; Bucharest, Kingdom of Romania
- Died: 2 December 1950 (aged 33) Geneva, Switzerland
- Genre: Classical Music
- Occupation: Pianist • Composer
- Label: EMI
- Formerly of: The Romanian Academy

Constantin "Dinu" Lipatti (Romanian pronunciation: [ˈdinu liˈpati]; 1 April [O.S. 19 March] 1917 – 2 December 1950) was a Romanian classical pianist and composer whose career was cut short by his death from effects related to Hodgkin's disease at age 33. He was elected posthumously to the Romanian Academy. He composed few works, all of which demonstrated a strong influence from Hungarian composer Béla Bartok.

A relentless perfectionist, Lipatti often prepared many years for major performances, such as four years for Beethoven's Piano Concerto No. 5 and three for Tchaikovsky's Piano Concerto No. 1. He left a small number of recordings, and they are well-regarded, particularly that of Alborada del gracioso from Ravel's Miroirs suite. In his short lifetime he was highly acclaimed by prominent musical figures of the 20th century, including Yehudi Menuhin, Alfred Cortot, Nadia Boulanger, and Francis Poulenc.

== Biography ==
=== Early life ===
Constantin Lipatti (from childhood called by the diminutive "Dinu") was born in Bucharest into a musical family: his father was a violinist who had studied with Pablo de Sarasate and Carl Flesch, his mother a pianist. For his baptism, which occurred not shortly after birth as is usual, but when he was old enough to play the piano, the violinist and composer George Enescu agreed to be his godfather. Lipatti played a minuet by Mozart at his own baptism.

He studied at the Gheorghe Lazăr High School, while studying piano and composition with Mihail Jora for three years. He then attended the Bucharest Conservatoire, studying under Florica Musicescu, who also taught him privately. In June 1930, the best pupils at the Conservatoire gave a concert at the Bucharest Opera, and the 13-year-old Lipatti received a huge ovation for his performance of the Grieg Piano Concerto in A minor. In 1932 he won prizes for his compositions: a Piano Sonatina, and a Sonatina for Violin and Piano. That year he also won a Grand Prize for his symphonic suite Les Tziganes.

=== Career ===
He entered the 1933 Vienna International Piano Competition and finished second to Polish pianist Bolesław Kon, some say controversially. Alfred Cortot, who thought Lipatti should have won, resigned from the jury in protest. Lipatti subsequently studied in Paris under Cortot, Nadia Boulanger (with whom he recorded some of Brahms's Waltzes Op. 39), Paul Dukas (composition) and Charles Munch (conducting). At eighteen, Lipatti gave his recital debut in Paris at the École Normale. On 17 May 1935, three days before the concert, his friend and teacher, Paul Dukas, died and in his memory Lipatti opened his program with J. S. Bach's Jesu, Joy of Man's Desiring in the transcription by Myra Hess, the first piece he publicly performed as an adult pianist.

Lipatti's career was interrupted by World War II. Although he gave concerts across the Nazi-occupied territories, as the war grew closer he fled his native Romania in September 1943 with his companion and fellow pianist, Madeleine Cantacuzene. With the aid of Edwin Fischer he emigrated to Geneva, Switzerland, where he accepted a position as professor of piano at the Geneva Conservatory. His pupils at the conservatory included Charles Reiner and Béla Síki.

It was while teaching at the Geneva Conservatory in the 1940s that the first signs of Lipatti's illness emerged. At first, doctors were baffled, and in 1947 he was diagnosed with Hodgkin's disease. He and Madeleine married in 1948 as Lipatti's health continued to decline. As a result, his public performances became considerably less frequent after the war. His energy level was improved for a time by then experimental injections of cortisone and his collaboration with record producer Walter Legge and Columbia Graphophone/EMI of the UK between 1947 and 1950 resulted in the majority of the recordings of Lipatti's playing.

=== Later years and death ===
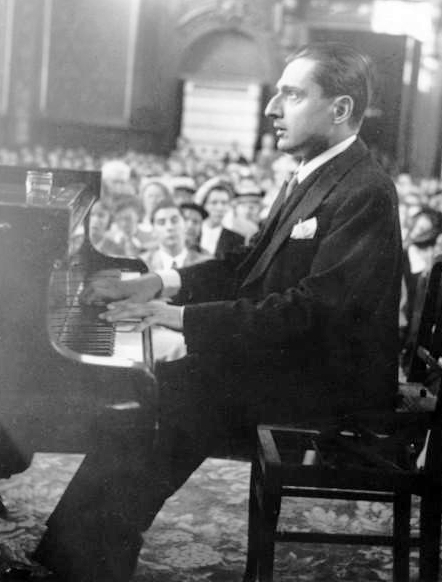
Lipatti's final concert in Besançon on 16 September 1950.

Lipatti gave his final recital, also recorded, on 16 September 1950 at the Besançon Festival in France. Despite severe illness and a high fever, he gave superb performances of Bach's Partita No. 1 in B♭ major, Mozart's A minor Sonata, K. 310, Schubert's G♭ major and E♭ major Impromptus, Op. 90, and thirteen of the fourteen Chopin Waltzes which he played in his own integral order. Coming to the last one, No. 2 in A♭, he found he was too exhausted to play it and he offered instead Jesu, Joy of Man's Desiring, the piece with which he had begun his professional career only fifteen years before. He died less than three months later in Geneva aged 33, from a burst abscess on his one lung. Lipatti is buried at the cemetery of Chêne-Bourg next to his wife Madeleine (1908–1982), a noted piano teacher.

== Repertoire ==
Lipatti's piano playing is widely appreciated for the absolute purity of his interpretations, at the service of which he used a masterful pianistic technique. Lipatti is particularly noted for his interpretations of Chopin, Mozart and Bach, and he also made recordings of Ravel's Alborada del Gracioso, Liszt, Enescu, and the Schumann and Grieg piano concertos. His recording of Chopin's Waltzes has remained in print since its release and has long been a favorite of many classical music-lovers.

Lipatti never recorded any of Beethoven's music. It is a common misconception, however, that Lipatti did not perform Beethoven's music until late in his career. The Waldstein Sonata had been a feature of Lipatti's repertoire since 1935. He also performed the Emperor Concerto in Bucharest twice during the 1940–41 season, and even stood ready to record it for EMI in 1949. An internal memo from Lipatti's recording producer Walter Legge, dated 23 February 1948, states that "Lipatti ha[d] his heart set on doing a Beethoven Concerto in 1949" and nominates the Emperor Concerto, given that Lipatti had already performed it.

A recording of Chopin's Piano Concerto No. 1 in E minor, originally released under Lipatti's name, and said to have been a recording of a live performance in Switzerland in May 1948, proved not to be his contribution at all. In 1981, it emerged that the soloist on this recording was in fact a Polish pianist (and a fellow Cortot pupil), Halina Czerny-Stefańska, the joint winner of the 4th International Chopin Piano Competition, playing with the Czech Philharmonic Orchestra under Václav Smetáček. However, later on, an authentic recording by Lipatti of the Chopin Concerto was found.

Harold C. Schonberg wrote in 1953 "Lipatti, a master of the keyboard, would have developed into one of the supreme artists of this era. He was a pianist of the Rachmaninoff order, blessed with an enormous technique and a strong rhythmic sense."

== Legacy ==
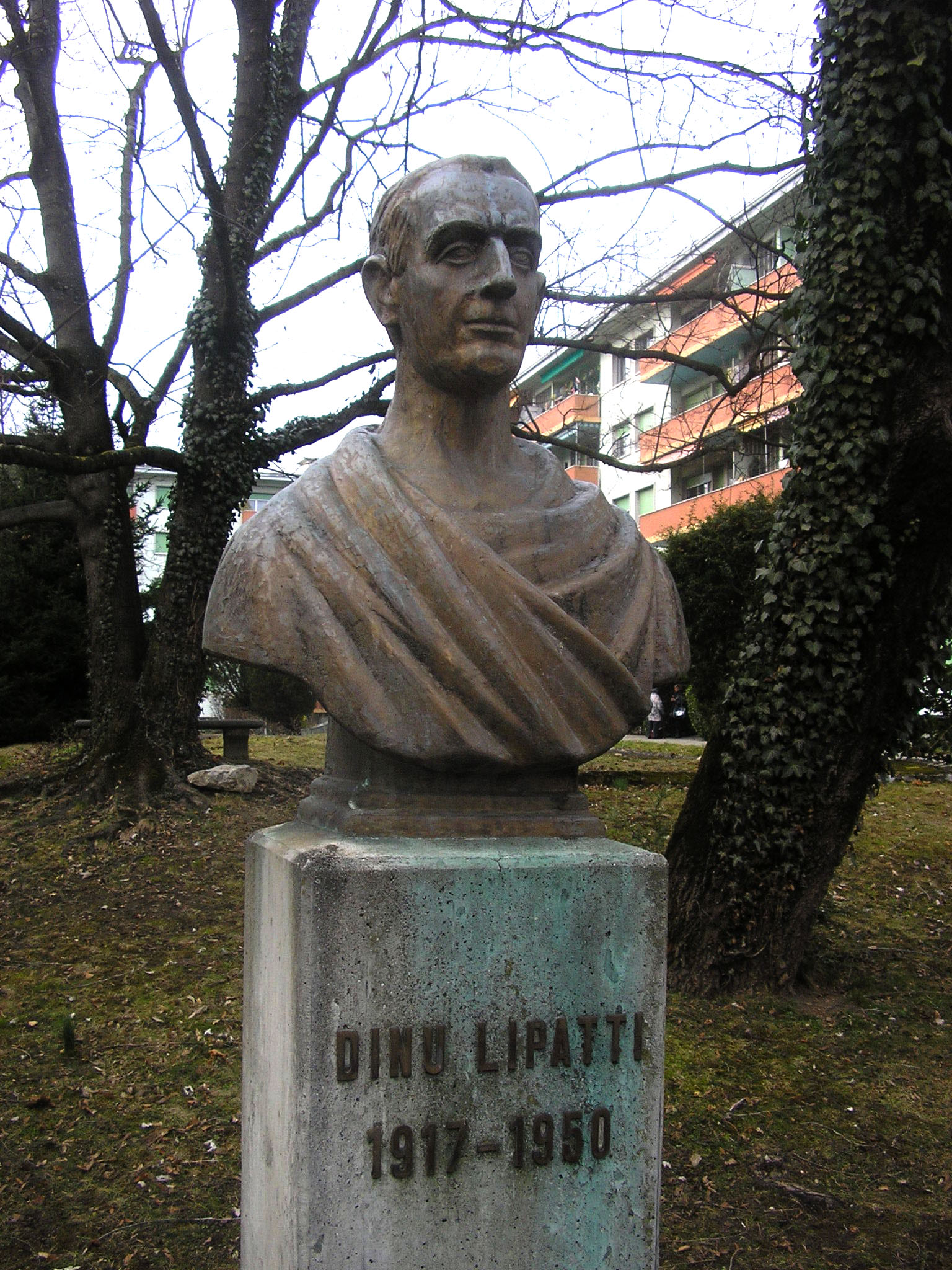
Bust of Dinu Lipatti in the park that bears his name in Chêne-Bourg (sculpted by Vasile Rus-Batin)

In recognition of his outstanding contributions to classical music interpretation and composition he was posthumously elected in 1997 as a member of the Romanian Academy. In 2005, The Mountain Goats released a song in his honor, titled "Dinu Lipatti's Bones". In 2017 Lipatti admirer Orlando Murrin discovered the only known film footage of Lipatti, at a Lucerne garden party in 1947 with Paul Hindemith and other musicians, which was screened at London's Cadogan Hall that November.

As of 2025 Lipatti's home at Bulevardul Lascăr Catargiu 10 is part of the Municipal Museum of Bucharest. The municipality named it Casa Artelor Dinu Lipatti in 2017 with a mandate as a cultural center, but later became part of the Municipal Museum under the name Casa Memorială Dinu Lipatti.

== Compositions ==
In addition to his pianistic accomplishments, Lipatti was a composer, who wrote in a neoclassical style with French and Romanian influences. His works include:

- Les Tziganes, symphonic suite (1934)
- Concertino in Classical Style, Op. 3 for piano and chamber orchestra (1936)
- Symphonie concertante for two pianos and string orchestra (1938)
- Piano Sonatina for the left hand (1941)
- Danses roumaines for two pianos (1943) and for orchestra (1945)
- Concerto for organ and piano
- Aubade for woodwind quartet (fl, ob, cl, bn)
- Woodwind quintet - Quintet a vent a Monsieur Roger Cortet (unfinished / first part)
- Improvisation for Piano Trio
- Sonatina for violin and piano
- Piano Sonata in D minor
- Fantasie for piano, Op. 8
- Nocturne for piano
- Four songs for voice and piano
- Six Sonatas of Scarlatti (transcription for woodwind quintet)

== Notable recordings ==
- February 1937: Brahms, Waltzes, Op. 39, with Nadia Boulanger
- 14 January 1943: Lipatti, Concertino in Classical Style, with Hans von Benda and the Berlin Chamber Orchestra
- 4 March 1943: Lipatti, Sonatina for the Left Hand (Romanian Broadcasting)
- 18 October 1943: Enescu, Piano Sonata No. 3 in D, Op. 24, No. 3
- 1943: Enescu, Violin Sonata No 2 in F minor, Op. 6 (George Enescu, violin)
- 1943: Enescu, Violin Sonata No. 3 in A minor, Op. 25 "In Romanian Popular Manner" (Enescu, violin)
- 1943: Enescu: Bouree from Suite No. 2 in D, Op, 10
- 20 February 1947: Scarlatti, Sonata in D minor, K.9 "Pastorale"
- 1 and 4 March 1947: Chopin, Sonata No. 3 in B minor, Op. 58
- 18 and 29 September 1947: Grieg, Piano Concerto in A minor, with Alceo Galliera and the Philharmonia Orchestra
- 24 September 1947: Liszt, Sonetto del Petrarca no. 104
- 27 September 1947: Scarlatti: Sonata in E, K.380; Chopin: Nocturne No. 8 in D♭ major, Op. 27, No. 2
- 2 October 1947: J. S. Bach, Keyboard Concerto No. 1 in D minor, BWV 1052 (arranged by Busoni), with Eduard van Beinum and the Concertgebouw Orchestra
- 9 and 10 April 1948: Schumann, Piano Concerto in A minor, with Herbert von Karajan and the Philharmonia Orchestra
- 17 April 1948: Ravel, "Alborada del gracioso" from Miroirs
- 21 April 1948: Chopin, Barcarole in F♯ major, Op. 60
- 30 May 1948: Béla Bartók, Third Piano Concerto, South West German Radio Symphony Orchestra, Baden-Baden Rec. 30 May 1948, in Baden-Baden (Live Recording) Paul Sacher (1906-1999), Conductor
- c. 1948: Lipatti, Concertino in Classical Style, Op. 3 (live, unidentified conductor and orchestra)
- 7 February 1950: Chopin, Piano Concerto No. 1 in E minor, Op. 11, with Otto Ackermann and the Tonhalle-Orchester Zurich and Chopin, Etudes, Op. 25/5 and Op. 10/5
- 22 February 1950: Schumann, Piano Concerto in A minor, with Ernest Ansermet and the Suisse Romande Orchestra
- 5 July 1950: Chopin, Mazurka No. 32 in C♯ minor, Op. 50, No. 3
- 6–10 July 1950: Bach, Keyboard Partita No. 1 in B♭, BWV 825; 4 Bach transcriptions by Ferruccio Busoni, Myra Hess, and Wilhelm Kempff; Mozart, Piano Sonata No. 8 in A minor, K. 310; Chopin, 14 Waltzes (ordered by Lipatti)
- 23 August 1950: Mozart, Piano Concerto No. 21 in C, K. 467 (Lipatti cadenzas), with Herbert von Karajan and the Orchestre du Festival de Lucerne, in the Kunsthaus, Lucerne, Switzerland.
- 16 September 1950: Final Recital at Besançon (music of Bach, Mozart, Schubert, and Chopin)
