= Martin Davorin-Jagodić =

Croatian musician and educator (1935–2020)

Martin Davorin Jagodić

Background information
- Born: Davorin Jagodić; 16 December 1935; Pag, Yugoslavia
- Died: 8 March 2020 (aged 84) Auxerre, France
- Genres: electroacoustic, Installation, Intermedia, Performance art
- Occupations: composer, educator(movement Fluxus)

Martin Davorin Jagodić (16 December 1935 – 8 March 2020) was a Croatian contemporary music composer and educator born in Pag in 1935. His work includes theatre music, graphic scores, instructions for performances, multimedia installation art, radio art, electroacoustic music on tape as well as experimental film soundtracks.

== Biography ==
Davorin Jagodić studied music in Zagreb (Croatia) and Ljubljana (Slovenia), under Croatian composer Milko Kelemen, among others. He relocated to France in 1960 to study under Olivier Messiaen at Conservatoire de Paris and work at Pierre Schaeffer's Groupe de Recherches Musicales from 1967 to 1969. His career as an educator started in 1969 as assistant and then lecturer at the music department of Université de Vincennes Paris 8, later also teaching stage design and scenography at Ecole Nationale Supérieure des Arts Décoratifs from 1974 to 1988. In the 1990s, he taught musicology at Université de Saint-Denis, after the Université de Vincennes Paris 8 had relocated there in 1980.

From the mid-1970s and throughout the 1980s, Davorin Jagodić collaborated with composer Costin Miereanu on several projects and with the Groupe d'Etude et Réalisation Musicales (GERM), founded by Pierre Mariétan in 1966, alongside Mariétan, Miereanu, Horacio Vaggione, Mihai Mitrea-Celarianu, Guiseppe G. Englert, Pierre Barbaud, and others.

He died on 8 March 2020 in Auxerre, France.

== Graphic scores ==
Often relying on highly stylized, abstract graphic scores hardly offering any kind of musical clue in terms of instrumentation, actual notes to play or pitch, Davorin Jagodić's work of the 1960s and 1970s encompasses Conceptual art and Fluxus performance art, for which the interpreter is more like a collaborator or co-composer of the work. Graphic scores like Uberklavier, 1970 and Variations sur l'Opus 16, 1971, make sure that, if performed, they will sound like nothing the composer has anticipated, thus welcoming aleatoricism and freeing the interpreter from the tyranny of a score, in the John Cage tradition.

== Performances of the 1970s ==
An emblematic work of the 1970s is Body Music, 1971, in which a pianist plays in an adjacent room, remote from the audience, with electric sensors fixed on his body around chest, arms and mouth. The P.A. system on stage amplifies the pianist's movements, bodily sounds and breath but not the actual music played – as an option, a camera may reproduce the image of the pianist's movements.

In the 1970s, Davorin Jagodić often performed in former Yugoslavia, including a personal exhibition at Galerija Studentskog Centra, Zagreb, Croatia, in 1971, a performance during the Muzički Biennale Zagreb (Music Biennale Zagreb, directed by Milko Kelemen) in 1973, or his participation in the Aprilski Susret festival in Belgrade, Serbia, in 1972 and 1974.

In 1975, Davorin Jagodić released a long-playing record in the avant-garde music series Nova Musicha of Italian label Cramps Records. Titled Tempo Furioso (Tolles Wetter) and produced by Walter Marchetti in Milan, the music is a collage of electronic and found sounds.

== Film and multimedia ==
Davorin Jagodić composed music for several experimental films, starting with Environment in 1969, a film by Belgian directors L. Peire et J. Mil, for which he recorded an electroacoustic soundtrack at the IPEM - Institute for Psychoacoustics and Electronic Music, in Ghent, Belgium. He also created music for According to... by French film director Yann Beauvais in 1981.

Since the 1990s, Davorin Jagodić collaborates with former student, developer, electronic and installation artist Elisabeth Son (president of the association "Martin Davorin Jagodic Archives") on multimedia installations, like their installation during the Media-Scape Symposium in 1999 or the interactive, immersive sound installation Orchestre Virtuel in 2003.
