= Hugo Jan Huss =

Romanian orchestra conductor and music director

Hugo Jan Huss (January 26, 1934 – February 21, 2006) was an orchestra conductor and music director.

== Biography ==
He was born in Timișoara, Romania and died in La Crosse, Wisconsin.

He studied at the Bucharest Conservatory of Music where he was the favorite student of Constantin Silvestri. After graduation, he became conductor and music director of the Symphony Orchestra in Arad, a city in western Romania, close to his native town. In 1968, he went to Paris, France, and did not return to Romania. Later he was conductor and music director in Mexico and, from 1977, in Wisconsin.

He is buried in Arad's Pomenirea Cemetery.

== Sources ==
- Hugo Huss Memorial Website
- A life Remembered: Conductor brought symphony to a new level, Terry Rindfleisch, La Crosse Tribune
- Hugo Jan Huss, obituary, La Crosse Tribune
