= Enescu Prize =

Romanian music award

The Enescu Prize is a prize in music composition founded by Romanian composer George Enescu, awarded from 1913 to 1946, and afterwards by the National University of Music Bucharest. Enescu is regarded by many as Romania's most important musician. Winners have included Mihail Andricu and Sergiu Natra.

- 1913: Ion Nonna Otescu
- 1923: Mihail Andricu
- 1924: Mihail Andricu
- 1925: Mansi Barberis
- 1929: Didia Saint Georges
- 1930: Didia Saint Georges
- 1934: Mansi Barberis
- 1941: Mansi Barberis
- 1942: Roman Vlad – Sinfonietta
- 1945: Sergiu Natra – March and Chorale for orchestra and Divertimento in Ancient Style for string orchestra
- 1964: Tudor Ciortea – Din isprăvile lui Păcală (Some of Păcală's Exploits)
- 1970: Pierre Amoyal
- 1974: Pascal Bentoiu
- 1984: Felicia Donceanu
- 1995: Christian Wilhelm Berger – Inscription in Stone
- 1998: Maia Ciobanu
- 2001: Irina Odagescu

== See also ==
- George Enescu Festival
- George Enescu International Piano Competition
