= Mansi Barberis =

Romanian violinist, music educator, conductor and composer

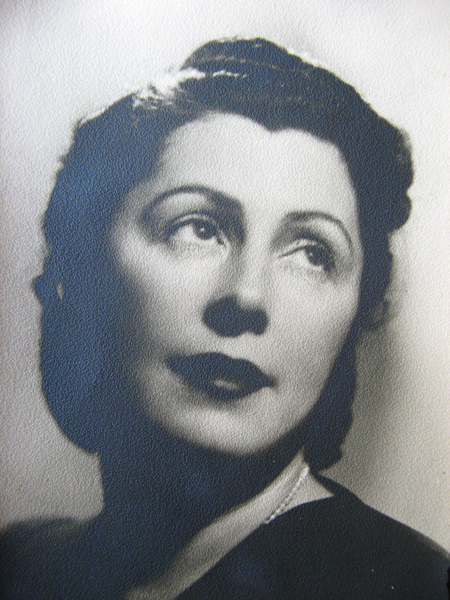
Mansi Barberis

Mansi (Clemensa) Barberis (March 12, 1899 – October 11, 1986) was a Romanian violinist, music educator, conductor, and composer.

== Life ==
Clemensa Barberis was born in Iași, the daughter of Giuseppe Barberis and Marguerite Cazaban. She began to improvise on the piano at an early age. When an aunt transcribed one of the pieces, composer George Enescu recommended that Barberis take theory lessons. She studied with Italian professors in Iași and later studied violin, voice, and composition at the George Enescu Conservatory.

Barberis graduated from the Conservatory in 1922. She married surgeon Gheorghe Plăcințeanu, taking the surname Barberis-Plăcințeanu, and had a daughter, which she left with her parents so she could continue her studies in Berlin. She returned to Romania after a year and took professional employment, but later continued her studies in Paris during three sessions, studying voice, conducting, opera, composition and orchestration. In 1936 she also studied voice briefly in Vienna with Max Reger.

Her opera were performed at the Romanian National Opera, Bucharest and by the Opera Company of Iași. Her music was also recorded and broadcast on Romanian Television (RTV). She was awarded the Enescu Prize in 1925, 1934, and 1941 and the Order of Cultural Merit in 1969.

== Works ==
Barberis' music is strongly influenced by Romanian folk music. She wrote over one hundred art songs, symphonic music, four opera, instrumental music and choral works. Selected compositions include:

- Itinerar dacic (1976) to verses by playwright Dominic Stancu
- Destin de poet (1981) to verses by Mihai Eminescu
- Kera Duducea (1963) opera
- Apus de soare (Sunset) (1961) opera
- Rondelurile rozelor (1982) song cycle to verses by Alexandru Macedonski

Barberis published an autobiography, Din zori până în amurg (From Dawn until Dusk). She died on October 11, 1986 in Bucharest.
