= Sorin Lerescu =

Romanian composer (born 1953)

Sorin Lerescu

Sorin Lerescu (born November 14, 1953, in Craiova) is a Romanian composer who studied at the National University of Music in Bucharest.
