= Ștefan Niculescu =

Romanian composer and musicologist (1927–2008)

- Born: July 31, 1927; Moreni, Dâmbovița County, Romania
- Died: January 22, 2008 (aged 80)
- Occupations: Composer; musicologist; academic teacher

Ștefan Niculescu (July 31, 1927 – January 22, 2008) was a Romanian composer, musicologist, and professor. He composed contemporary art music, spanning many genres. He took particular inspiration from the musical folklore of the Far East, heterophony, and electronic music. For many years he taught composition at the National University of Music Bucharest.

Niculescu was born in Moreni, Dâmbovița County. He created his own type of heterophony, a technique based on superimposing melodic material onto variations of itself in order to create textures that are propelled by thematic energy as well as by the more common textural factors of density and levels of activity. This creative approach bears similarities with György Ligeti's micropolyphony, but important aesthetic and stylistic differences set them apart.

== Studies ==
Between 1941 and 1946 Niculescu studied at the Royal Academy of Music (the Bucharest Conservatory). He then turned to engineering, studying at the Bucharest Institute of Civil Engineering until 1950, before returning to the Academy of Music. There he studied composition with Mihail Andricu between 1951 and 1957. He later took part in the Darmstadt Summer Courses for New Music (1966–1969) and in courses in electronic music at the Siemens electronic music studio in Munich (1966).

== Career ==
=== Teaching ===
Between 1958 and 1960 Niculescu taught piano, and from 1960 to 1963 he worked as a researcher at the Institute of Art History. From 1963 he was a professor at the Bucharest Conservatory, teaching musical analysis and composition; he left in 1987 and returned six years later, and in 2001 he was named honorary pro-rector of the institution.

His work as a teacher made him a mentor to many notable Romanian composers, among them Costin Miereanu, Horațiu Rădulescu, and Dan Dediu. In the 1970s he contributed to the popularization of modern music by organizing public listenings in Bucharest together with Șerban Stănciulescu. In 1991 he founded the International Week of New Music in Bucharest.

=== Composer ===
Among the foreign composers Niculescu cited as influences were Iannis Xenakis and Pierre Boulez; he valued Boulez's interest in heterophonic writing, which he himself explored through the traditional music of Southeast Asia, such as the gamelan ensembles of Indonesia. He composed more than 70 works across many genres, ranging from chamber and orchestral music to vocal works and opera. His scores were published by Editura Muzicală, Éditions Salabert, Ars Viva / B. Schott's Söhne (Mainz), and Gerig Musikverlag (Cologne), and were recorded by Electrecord (Romania), Erato (France), and Attacca Records (Netherlands).

=== Musicologist ===
Niculescu contributed to a monograph on George Enescu (1972, Romanian Academy Publishing House), for which he was awarded a prize by the Académie des Beaux-Arts. His theoretical writings were collected in Reflecții despre muzică ("Reflections on Music"; Editura Muzicală, Bucharest, 1980).

== Music and style ==
Niculescu's work Ison II for wind and percussion permutates simultaneous segments of a diatonic melody producing a reverberating complexity of sound which is held together by a strong sense of modal clarity. Opus Dacicum for orchestra applies similar textural explorations but with a stronger sense of harmonic movement, often with a Wagnerian lushness that lends this music a sensuous appeal a world apart from Ligeti's cluster-oriented sonorities.

== Selected works ==
=== Orchestral ===
- Symphony No. 1 (1956), for large orchestra
- Eteromorfie (Heteromorphie, 1967), for orchestra
- Unisonos I (1970), for orchestra
- Unisonos II (1971), for orchestra
- Ison I (1973), for orchestra
- Ison II (1975), for orchestra
- Symphony No. 2 "Opus dacicum" (1980), for large orchestra
- Sincronie II (1981), for orchestra
- Symphony No. 3 "Cantos" (1984–1986), for solo woodwinds and orchestra (three versions with different soloists)
- Symphony No. 4 "Deisis" (1995)
- Symphony No. 5 "Litanii" (1997)
- Formanți (undated)

=== Chamber ===
- Invențiuni (1963), for clarinet and piano
- Echos I (1977), for violin
- Ricercare in uno (1984), for synthesizer, clarinet, and violin
- Hétérophonies pour Montreux (1986), for five instruments
- Octuplum (1987), for eight instruments
- Chant-son (1989), for saxophone
- Sequentia (1994), for six instruments
- Undecimum (1998), for eleven instruments

=== Vocal ===
- three cantatas (1959–1965)
- Aforisme de Heraclit ("Aphorisms of Heraclitus", 1969), for 20 solo voices
- Invocatio (1988), choral symphony
- Axion (1992), for women's choir and saxophone
- Psalmus (1993), for six voices

=== Stage ===
- Cartea cu Apolodor (premiered 1975, Cluj-Napoca), a children's opera-ballet with a libretto by Gellu Naum

=== Film ===
- Calea Victoriei sau cheia visurilor (1966)
- Faust XX (1966)

== Awards and honours ==
Niculescu received many awards from the Romanian Academy for composition in 1962 and for musicology in 1972. He also received awards from the Society of Romanian Composers for composition in 1975, 1977, 1981, 1983, 1985, 1986, 1988, and 1998, and won its grand prize in 1994. He also received a prize from the Académie des Beaux-Arts in Paris (1972), the International Record Critics Award (1985), a lifetime achievement award at the Montreux–Vevey classical music festival, and the Herder Prize in Vienna (1994).

He was elected a corresponding member of the Romanian Academy in 1993 and a titular member in 1996, and he was made a doctor honoris causa of the Academy of Music in Cluj.

=== Decorations ===
- Cultural Merit Medal, first class (September 26, 1966)
- Order of Faithful Service, Knight rank (December 1, 2000)
- Order of the Star of Romania, Commander rank (December 1, 2000)

== Sources ==
- Sandu-Dediu, Valentina (2004). "Ștefan Niculescu". Program booklet of the International Week of New Music (14th edition, 23–30 May 2004) (in Romanian).
- Sava, Iosif; Vartolomei, Luminița (1979). Dicționar de muzică. Bucharest: Editura Științifică și Enciclopedică.
