= Alfred Mendelsohn =

Romanian composer

Alfred Mendelsohn (17 February 1910 – 9 May 1966) was a Romanian composer.

Mendelsohn studied from 1927 to 1931 at the Music Academy in Vienna with Joseph Marx and Franz Schmidt and the Conservatory in Bucharest at Mihail Jora. From 1944 to 1963 he was conductor at the Romanian National Opera, 1949, he taught as professor of counterpoint at the Conservatory.

He composed several operas and ballets, eight symphonies and a dramatic symphony in seven scenes, a symphonic poem, a string suite, a cello concerto, two violin concertos, two piano concertos, chamber works, oratorios, cantatas, drama and film music, choral works and songs.

== Selected Compositions ==
Stage

- Imnul iubirii (Anthem of Love), opera (1946); libretto by Al.Delvechi after Ivan Turgenev
- Harap Alb (The White Moor after a fairytale by Ion Creangă), ballet (1948), libretto by Alexandru Jar
- Meșterul Manole (Manole the Craftsman), opera (1949); after a popular legend, libretto by Alexandru Jar
- Călin, ballet (1956); choreography by Tilde Urseanu, after the poem "Luceafărul" by Mihai Eminescu
- Anton Pann, operetta (1961); libretto by Ion Roman and Radu Albala
- Michelangelo, opera (1964); libretto by the composer after Alexandru Kirițescu
- Spinoza, opera (1966); libretto by Paul Sterian
- Cântec pentru Stalin (Song for Stalin), ode (1950)
- Glasul lui Lenin (Lenin's voice), cantata (1957), text by Maria Banuș

Concertante

- Concerto for viola and orchestra (1965)

Chamber music

- Petite Suite for viola solo (1933)
- Suite for cello solo (1960)
- Partita (Prelude and Fugue) for violin solo
