= Grigore Nica =

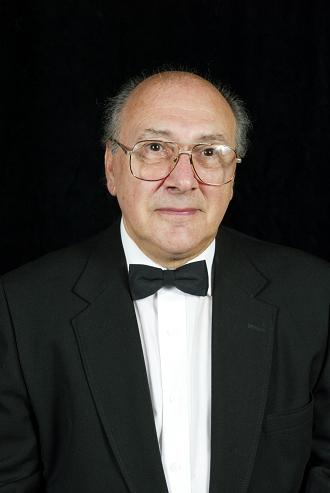
Romanian composer Grigore Nica

Grigore Nica (1936–2009) was a Romanian composer, music teacher and performer.

He was born in Ploiesti, Romania on October 14, 1936, the son of Mihail and Eugenia (b. Provian). The family moved to Tulcea in 1948.

On November 9, 1952, he was jailed for his political beliefs against Communism and dictatorship. After his release from prison, Grigore completed high school and started his studies in Bucharest at the Ciprian Porumbescu Music Conservatory (currently Universitatea Națională de Muzică) in 1955.

In 1956 he was banned from the conservatory for refusing to collaborate with the Romanian secret police Securitate, and moved back to Tulcea, where he worked as a violin teacher for six years.

Grigore successfully re-enrolled in conservatory in 1963, and went on to complete his studies and receive his master's degree in Composition, Conducting and Teaching in 1968. After graduating, he became a member of the Composers' and Musicologists' Union of Romania in 1968, and worked for 20 years as a music editor for the Romanian National Radio Station in Bucharest.

On June 11, 1990, Grigore, along with his son and daughter, moved to Torrance, California. Between 1990 and 1991 he became a member of the Music Teachers' Association of California (MTAC), joined the professional music fraternity Mu Phi Epsilon as well as the Beach Cities Symphony Orchestra as a violin player. Additionally, he became a member of the American Society of Composers, Authors and Publishers (ASCAP) in 1992.

During this time, he taught violin, viola, piano and composition at his private studio, as well as the Gray School of Music and the European School of Music. Grigore became a U.S. Citizen in 1996.

In 2008, the Romanian RadioTV Studio Orchestra, conducted by Cristian Brancusi, performed and released on the radio the premiere of Grigore Nica's "Concert for Strings and Orchestra". On June 17, 2008 the Composer's Union of Romania honored Grigore Nica's 70th birthday at the Enescu House and Museum with a musical portrait. He was celebrated by his colleagues for his active composing career as well as his work as a radio and television presenter, where he worked on numerous musical and educational shows.

Additionally, his works have been performed in the United States on multiple occasions in 1996, 1998, 2000, 2004 and 2009.

Grigore Nica died on September 3, 2009 at Torrance Memorial Hospital due to complications from cancer.
