= Florica Musicescu =

Romanian pianist and musical pedagogue

Florica Musicescu, Bucharest 1964

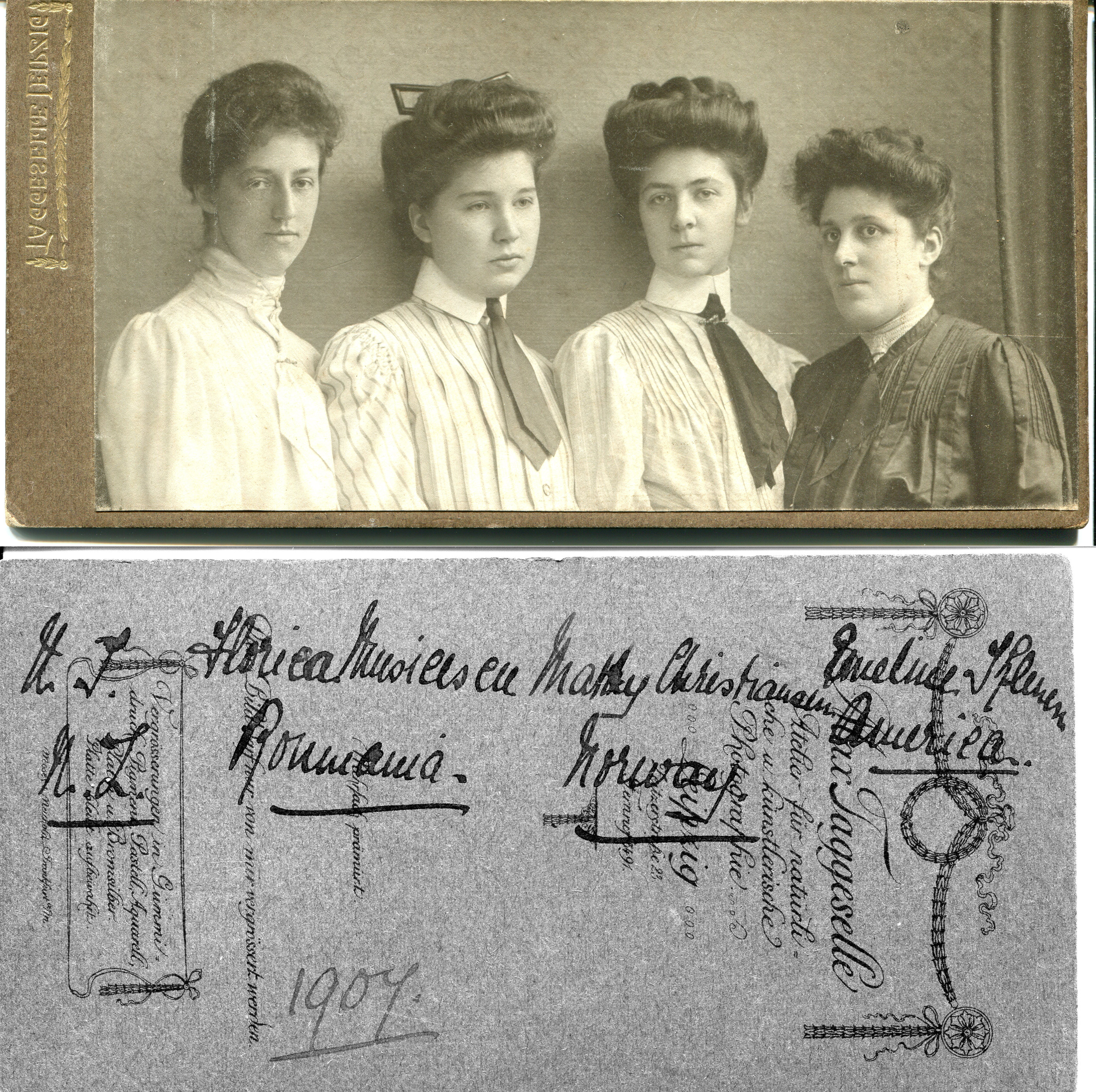
Four pupils of Leipzig Conservatory of Music, 1907. Left to right: Ursula Tewsley (New Zealand), Florica Musicescu (Romania), Mally Christiansen (Norway), Emeline Thlenen (America)

Florica Musicescu (21 May 1887, Iași–19 March 1969, Bucharest) was a renowned Romanian pianist and musical pedagogue, daughter of the renowned composer, conductor and musicologist Gavriil Musicescu.

She taught piano music for many decades at the Bucharest Conservatory (known as Royal Music Academy prior to World War II). For her masterful guidance and mentorship, she is considered to be one of the founders of the Romanian School of Piano Music. Many of the famous pianists of the 20th century emerged from this school: Mihai Brediceanu, Paul Dan, Dan Grigore, Mindru Katz, Dinu Lipatti, Myriam Marbe, Radu Lupu, Svetla Protich, Madeleine Cantacuzene, Sorin Enăchescu, Maria Fotino, Corneliu Gheorghiu, Marietta Orlov, Shulamith Shapira and Tamás Vesmás.
