= Myriam Marbé =

Romanian composer and pianist

Myriam Marbé (9 April 1931 in Bucharest – 25 December 1997 in Bucharest) was a Romanian composer and pianist. She won a number of prizes, including the GEDOK at Mannheim in 1961, 1966 and 1970, six first prizes from the Composers' Union of Romania, the Bernier Prize and the Romanian Academy Prize.

== Life ==
Marbe received her first piano lessons from her mother, Angela Marbe, who was a piano teacher. Her father Max Marbe was a bacteriologist. She studied at the Bucharest Conservatory from 1944 to 1954, where she took classes in piano with Florica Musicescu and Silvia Căpățână, as well as in composition with Leon Klepper and Mihail Jora. From 1953 to 1965, she was a film director at the Casa de filme in Bucharest. She taught counterpoint and composition at the Bucharest Conservatory from 1954 to 1988, where her refusal to join the Romanian Communist Party prevented her from reaching the rank of Professor.

Between 1968 and 1972, she managed to obtain permission from Romanian authorities to travel to the West and participate in the Darmstadt New Music Summer School in West Germany, and in 1971, at the Royan Festival for Contemporary Music in France. After the collapse of Communism in Eastern Europe, she was awarded a working grant from the German city of Mannheim for the year 1989–90. Marbe won a number of prizes, including the GEDOK at Mannheim in 1961, 1966 and 1970, six first prizes from the Composers' Union of Romania, the Bernier Prize and the Romanian Academy Prize.

Besides being a composer, Marbe worked as a journalist and musicologist. She co-authored a monograph on George Enescu and also wrote critical essays and analyses on musical style, and an essay on the role of women in Romanian folklore.

The composer's collection is located at the Sophie Drinker Institut in Bremen, and most of the scores are available at the institute's website.

== Works ==
- Nunta Zamfirei, ballet, 1954
- Sonata for viola and piano, 1955
- In Memoriam, lyrical piece for oboe, 2 horns, piano, celesta, drum set, and string orchestra, 1959
- Chorsuite, choral suite on texts by Ilie Constantin and Paul Aristide, 1959
- Sonata (Prologo – Aria – Epilogo) for 2 violas, 1966
- Le Temps Inévitable, 1968–71
- Serenata – Eine kleine Sonnenmusik, 1974
- La parabol du grenier for an interpreter on piano, harpsichord, celesta, and optional glockenspiel and tubular bells, 1975–76
- Concerto for Viola and Orchestra, 1977
- Trium, symphonic piece for large orchestra, 1978
- Souvenir d'un paysage inconnu for flute and viola, 1979
- Timpul regasit for soprano or tenor, recorder, 3 violas, alto and tenor viol, and harpsichord, 1982
- Trommelbass, for string trio and drums, 1985
- Sonata per due for viola and flute, 1985
- Des-cântec for woodwind quintet with doublings of piccolo, alto flute, english horn, e-flat clarinet, bass clarinet, and contrabassoon, 1985
- An die Sonne for mezzo-soprano and saxophone, 1986
- Concertul pentru Daniel Kientzy și saxofon, 1986
- After nau, sonata for cello and organ, 1987
- Ur-Ariadne-Sinfonie Nr. 1 for mezzo-soprano, saxophone, and orchestra, 1988
- Dialogi – nicht nur ein Bilderbuch für Christian Morgenstern, 1989
- Farbe und Klang, song cycle on texts by Ulrich von Liechtenstein, Heinrich von Veldeke, Heinrich Heine, Friedrich von Hausen, König Konrad, and Christian Morgenstern
- Fra Angelico – Chagall – Voronet – Requiem for mezzo-soprano, choir, and chamber ensemble, 1990
- Stabat Mater for 12 voices and flute, oboe, clarinet, bassoon, trumpet, horn, trombone, percussion, viola, and double bass
- Paos for viola and clarinet, 1995
- Sym-phonia for mezzo-soprano and chamber ensemble on poems by Else Lasker-Schüler, 1996
- arc-en-ciel for recorder and flute, 1997
- Song of Ruth for 5 cellos, 1997
