= Leon Klepper =

Romanian composer

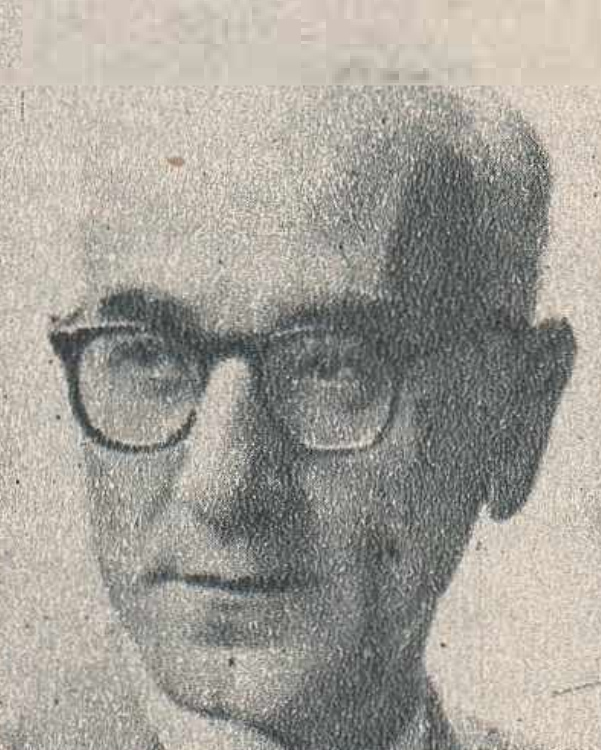
Image of Leon Klepper

Leon Klepper (24 April 1900 in Iași, Romania – 7 December 1991 in Freiburg Brsg., Germany) was a Romanian composer of classical music.

Born to a Jewish family in Iași, Klepper studied in Vienna with Joseph Marx, in Berlin with Franz Schreker and with Paul Dukas and Alfred Cortot (piano) in Paris, where he lived until 1939. From 1949 to 1959, he was a composition professor at the National University of Music Bucharest. Afterwards, he lived as a freelance composer and music teacher in Freiburg im Breisgau where he died in 1991 aged 91.

He composed two symphonic poems, a Festive Overture, a Concerto grosso, a Concertino for piano four hands, a partita for piano and orchestra, chamber music works and piano pieces. He wrote the film scores for The Family Ornament (Bijuterii de Familie), Romania, 1958 and Destroyed Citadel (Citadela Fărimată), Romania, 1957.
