= Dumitru Georgescu Kiriac =

Romanian composer, conductor, and ethnomusicologist (1866–1928)

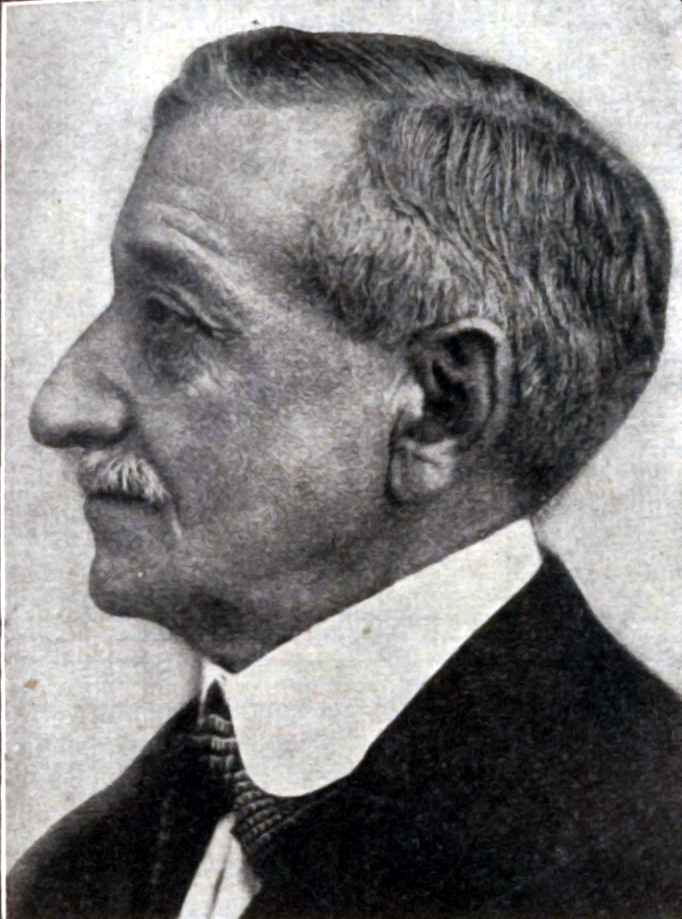
Dumitru Georgescu-Kiriac

Dumitru Georgescu Kiriac (18 March 1866 – 8 January 1928) was a Romanian composer, conductor, and ethnomusicologist. He was particularly known for his sacred choral works and art songs which were based on the Romanian Orthodox tradition and Romanian folklore.

== Biography ==
Kiriac was born in Bucharest and began his musical studies at the Bucharest Conservatory (now the National University of Music) with Gheorghe Brătianu (1847–1905) and Eduard Wachmann (1836–1908). From 1892 to 1899 he studied in Paris with Vincent d'Indy at the Schola Cantorum de Paris and with Charles-Marie Widor and Gabriel Fauré at the Paris Conservatory. See: List of music students by teacher: K to M#Dumitru Georgescu Kiriac. It was during this time that he began collecting Romanian children's folk songs. On his return to Bucharest in 1900 he became a professor at the Bucharest Conservatory. The following year he founded the Romanian choral society, Carmen. One of his students was Achim Stoia.

Kiriac died in his native city at the age of 61. He was considered one of the founders of modern Romanian music. Festivalul Internaţional de Muzică Corală "D.G. Kiriac", an international festival of sacred choral music held annually in the city of Pitești, is named in his honour as is the city's male voice choir.
