= Aurel Stroe =

Romanian composer, philosopher and linguist (1932 - 2008)

Aurel Stroe (5 May 1932, in Bucharest – 3 October 2008, in Mannheim) was a Romanian composer, philosopher and linguist. In 2002 he was awarded the Herder Prize from the University of Vienna.

== Life and career ==
From 1951 to 1956 Stroe studied piano with Maria Totino, composition with Mihail Andricu, and harmony with Marṭian Negrea at the Bucharest Conservatory. He also took summer courses at the Darmstadt Conservatory from 1966 to 1969 where he was a pupil of Mauricio Kagel, György Ligeti, and Karlheinz Stockhausen. He was awarded a scholarship from the German Academic Exchange Service which enabled him to pursue research at the International Comparative Musicology Institute of Alain Danielou in 1972-1973.

Stroe was appointed the position of reader at the Bucharest Conservatory in 1962. From 1986 to 1993 he was a professor of composition at the Mannheim Hochschule für Musik. In 2006, he was awarded the Promaetheus Prize by the Anonimul Foundation.

== Musical works ==
Including electronic music.

=== Opera ===
- Asta nu va primi Nobel Prize (1969) - opera în three parts (Paul Sterian)
- Pacea (1973) - opera în three acts (Aristophanes)
- Trilogia Cetății Închise (1973-1988) opera, libretto after Aeschylus: Agamemnon / Orestia I (1973), Choeforele / Orestia II (1983), Eumenidele / Orestia III (1988)
- Conciliul Mondial (1987) - chamber opera in two acts (Vladimir Solovyov}
- Copilul și diavolul (1989) - opera in 5 scenes (Maria Tvetaeva)

=== Theatre music ===
- Music for "Oedip la Colonos" (1963) - incidental music (Sophocles);
- Rituelle Handlung ohne Gegenstand (1967) - dance music.

=== Vocal-symphonic music ===
- Cantata festivă (1957) - for choir and orchestra (Pablo Neruda)
- Chipul păcii (1959) - music for chamber orchestra and mezzo-soprano (Paul Eluard)
- Țării mele (1959) - cantata for choir and orchestra (Victor Tulbure)
- Monumentum I (1961) - poem for choir and orchestra (Nichita Stănescu)
- Numai prin timp timpul poate fi cucerit (1965) - poems for baritone (T.S. Eliot)
- Missa puerorum (1983) - for a cappella choir, organ and eight instruments

=== Symphonic music ===
- Scherzo simfonic (1951)
- Sinfonia for the Orchestra Mare (1954)
- Burlesque Overture (1961)
- Arcade (1962)
- Laude I (1966)
- Canto I (1967)
- Laude II (1968)
- Canto II (1971)
- Simfonia (1973)
- Accords et Comptines (1988)
- Ciaccona con alcune licenze (1995)
- Preludii lirice (1999)
- Mandala cu o polifonie de Antonio Lotti (2000)

=== Concertante music ===
- Concerto for string orchestra (1950, rev.1956)
- Concert music for piano, brass and percussion (1965)
- Concerto for clarinet and orchestra (1975)
- Concerto for violin and ensemble of soloists Capriccios and Ragas (1990)
- Concerto for saxophone and orchestra Prairie, Priere (1994)
- Concerto for accordion and orchestra (2001)
- Simfonia concertante for percussion and orchestra (1996)

=== Chamber music ===
- Colinde (Christmas Carols) for piano (1947)
- Baladă (Ballad) for piano (1948)
- Trio for oboe, clarinet and bassoon (1953)
- Sonata No. 1 for piano Morphogenetic (1955)
- Fragment dintr-un proces sonor (Excerpt from a sound-process) (1969)
- În vis desfacem timpurile suprapuse (1970)
- String quartet in A major (1972)
- Grădina structurilor I (Garden Structures I) (1974)
- Ten pastoral pieces for organ and clavecin (1979)
- Pe drumul către focurile cerești (Journey to Celestial Fires) for solo viola (1979)
- Fiicele Soarelui (Daughters of the Sun) (1979)
- Sonata No. 2 for piano Thermodynamic (1983)
- Anamorfoze canonice (1984)
- Sonata No. 3 for piano En Palimpseste (1992)
- Mozart sound introspection, string trio (1994)
- Gesang der Geister über den Wassern for voice, clarinet and piano or clavecin (celesta) (1999)
- Humoreske mit zwei Durchblicken zum Seeren (2002)

=== Choral music ===
- Vine trenul (Coming by Train) (1961)
- Cântec simplu (Simple Song) (1962)

=== Vocal music ===
- 5 Songs for Soprano and piano: Colind, Moștenire, Făcătură, Doi copii s-au dus, În perdea (1949)
- 5 Songs on verses by Clément Marot (1949)
- Two Songs on verses by Ion Pillat (1953)
- Two Romances for mezzo-soprano and piano: Și dacă..., La steaua (1954)

=== Electronic music ===
- Midi le Juste (1970)

== Bibliography ==
- Cosma, V. (2005). Muzicieni din România. Lexicon. Vol. 8 (P-S). București: Editura muzicală. (in Romanian)
- Omul zilei (Man of the Day) - Aurel Stroe, 20 October 2006, Violeta Cristea, Ramona Vintilă, Jurnalul Național (in Romanian)
