= Mihail Jora =

Romanian composer, pianist, and conductor

Mihail Jory
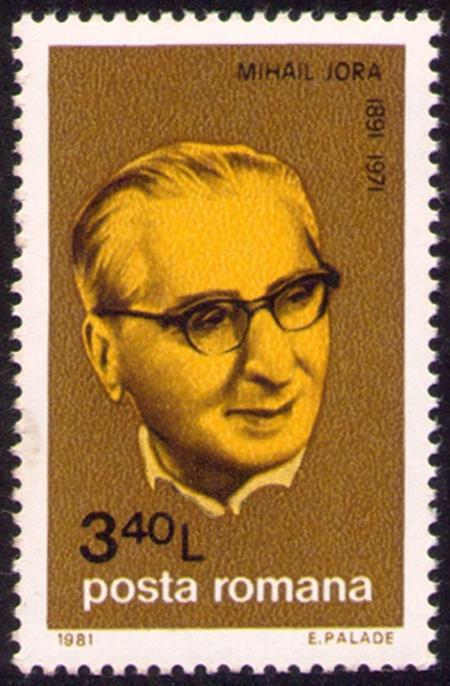
- Jora on a 1981 stamp
- Born: 19 August 1881; Liveni-Vârnav, Kingdom of Romania
- Died: 4 May 1955 (aged 73); Bucharest, Romania
- Occupations: Composer; Pianist; Conductor; Academic teacher
- Organizations: Bucharest Conservatoire

Mihail Jora (Romanian pronunciation: [mihaˈil ˈʒora]; 2 August 1891 - 10 May 1971) was a Romanian composer, pianist, and conductor.

== Training and career ==
Jora was born in Roman, Romania. He studied in Leipzig with Robert Teichmüller.

From 1929 to 1962 he was a professor at the Bucharest Conservatoire. He worked from 1928 to 1933 as a director/conductor of the Bucharest Broadcasting Orchestra. In 1944 he became vice-president of the Society of Romanian Composers: however, he soon came into criticism of the new communist government being accused of formalism (see Zhdanov Doctrine). In 1953, he was rehabilitated and allowed to rejoin the Composers' Union.

He composed six ballets, one symphony, two major orchestra works, and many pieces for piano, chamber-music, choral and vocal music. His students included the composer Florica Racovitză-Flondor.

Jora died in Bucharest on 10 May 1971.

Preceded by none	Principal Conductors, National Radio Orchestra of Romania; 1928–1933	Succeeded by Alfred Alessandrescu
