= National University of Music Bucharest =

Romanian university of music

- Universitatea Națională de Muzică București
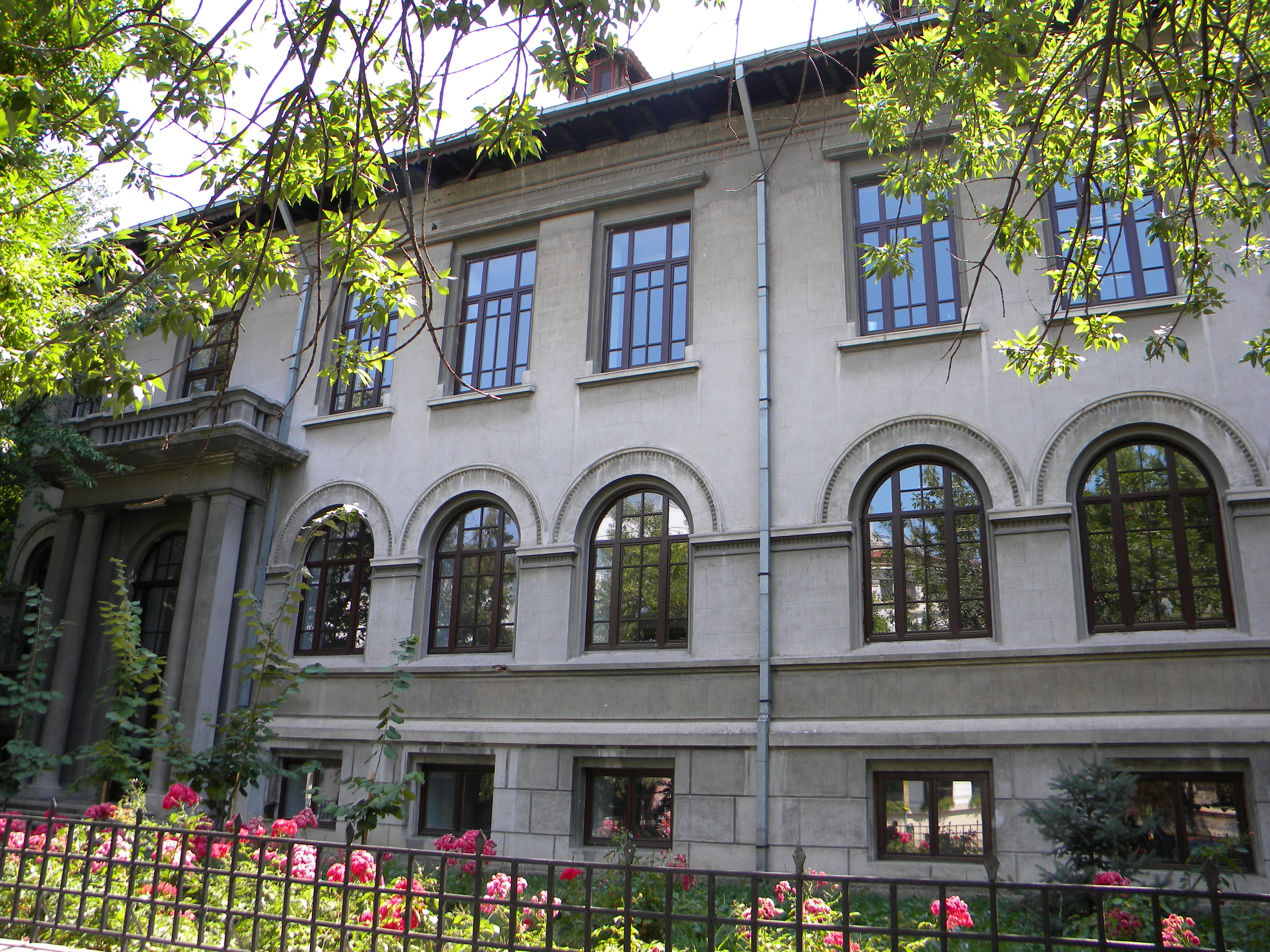
- Type: Public
- Established: June 1863; 163 years ago
- Founder: Alexandru Ioan Cuza
- Rector: Diana Asinefta Moș
- Location: Știrbei Vodă Street, nr. 33, Sector 1, Bucharest, 010102, Romania; 44°26′21″N 26°05′25″E
- Website: www.unmb.ro

The National University of Music Bucharest (Romanian: Universitatea Națională de Muzică București, UNMB) is a university-level school of music located in Bucharest, Romania. Established as a school of music in 1863 and reorganized as an academy in 1931, it has functioned as a public university since 2001. It also offered training in drama until 1950, when this function was taken over by two institutes which were later reunited as the Caragiale National University of Theatre and Film (UNATC).

== Structure ==
The National University of Music is divided into two faculties: the Faculty of Composition, Musicology and Musical Pedagogy and the Faculty of Performing Arts. Administratively, it is divided into the Department of Scientific Research and Artistic Activities, the Department of International Relations and European Programs, the Teacher Training Department, the Music Shows Department, and the Low-Residency Program Department (see also Education in Romania).

The main building and Rectorate is situated at 33, Știrbei Vodă Street in Sector 1 of Bucharest. As of 2025, UNMB's Rector is Diana Asinefta Moș.

== History ==
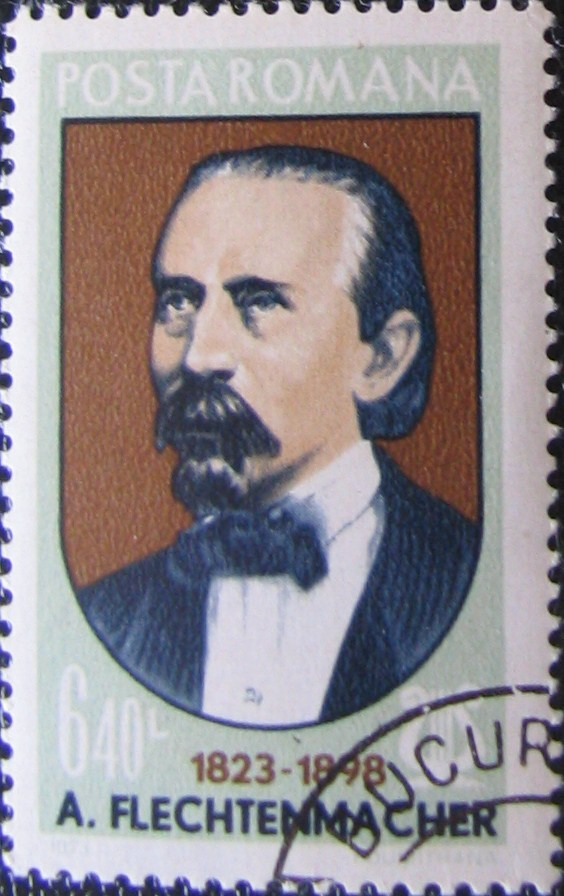
Alexandru Flechtenmacher on a Romanian stamp

The university was established in June 1863 as the Music and Declamation Conservatory (Conservatorul de Muzică și Declamațiune, also translated as Music and Drama Conservatory), by decree of Domnitor Alexandru Ioan Cuza. Initially, it was a secondary education institution which included two main sections, the Institute of Vocal Music and the School of Instrumental Music, with branches in Bucharest and Iași, Moldavia's former capital. The Bucharest branch replaced the Philharmonic School (Școala Filarmonică), which also offered lessons in acting.

The institution's first director was composer Alexandru Flechtenmacher, under whose leadership the Conservatory gave courses in violin, solfege, Christian music choir, piano, harmony, and singing. In 1900, composer Alfons Castaldi set up the first chamber music course.

During the interwar period, the Conservatory grew to accommodate counterpoint, orchestration, aesthetics and music history classes. On July 17, 1931, it was turned into an academy placed under the patronage of King Carol II, and renamed Royal Academy of Music and Dramatic Art (Academia Regală de Muzică și Artă Dramatică). This was largely due to the efforts of one of Romania's most celebrated composers, George Enescu, who was later named Honorary Professor. In the 1940s, the academy was led by Mihail Jora, whom the institution itself credits with having revolutionized teaching methods by imposing more rigor and innovative approaches.

In the 1950s, under the communist regime, the academy took the name of composer Ciprian Porumbescu, and reverted to the name of Conservatory—the Ciprian Porumbescu Conservatory or Conservatorul Ciprian Porumbescu. At the time, it was divided into two faculties: Performing Art and Composition, and Musicology, Orchestra Conducting and Pedagogy. In 1950, the drama department was turned into a separate Theater Institute, named after playwright Ion Luca Caragiale. It reunited with the Film Art Institute, a former branch of the Art Academy, in 1954, to form the UNATC. During this period, from 1950 to 1953, the veteran conductor George Georgescu, a close associate of Enescu who had himself studied cello at the institution a half century before, took his sole academic post, teaching the conducting class.

In 2001, twelve years after the Romanian Revolution, the Romanian government awarded the institution the status of a National University.

== Notable teachers ==
- Constantin Brăiloiu
- Sabin Drăgoi
- Ionel Gherea
- Magda Ianculescu
- Constantin Al. Ionescu-Caion
- Matei Millo
- Florica Musicescu
- Octavian Nemescu

== Notable alumni ==
- Mihail Andricu
- Anda-Louise Bogza
- Mihail Celarianu
- Elena Cernei
- Gheorghe Ciobanu
- George Ciprian
- Marius Constant
- Grigore Cugler
- Violeta Dinescu
- Attila Dorn
- Adrian Enescu
- Elena Gaja
- George Georgescu
- Angela Gheorghiu
- Alexandru Giugaru
- Radu Goldiș
- Pompeiu Hărășteanu
- Nicolae Herlea
- Hugo Jan Huss
- Magda Ianculescu
- Sorin Lerescu
- Dinu Lipatti
- Myriam Marbe
- Silvia Marcovici
- Valentina Naforniță
- Octavian Nemescu
- Temistocle Popa
- Elvira Popescu
- Speranța Rădulescu
- Vasile Șirli
- Achim Stoia
- Lucia Bercescu-Țurcanu
- Cristian Vasile
