= Out of All the Masts =

1880 poem by Mihai Eminescu

- by Mihai Eminescu
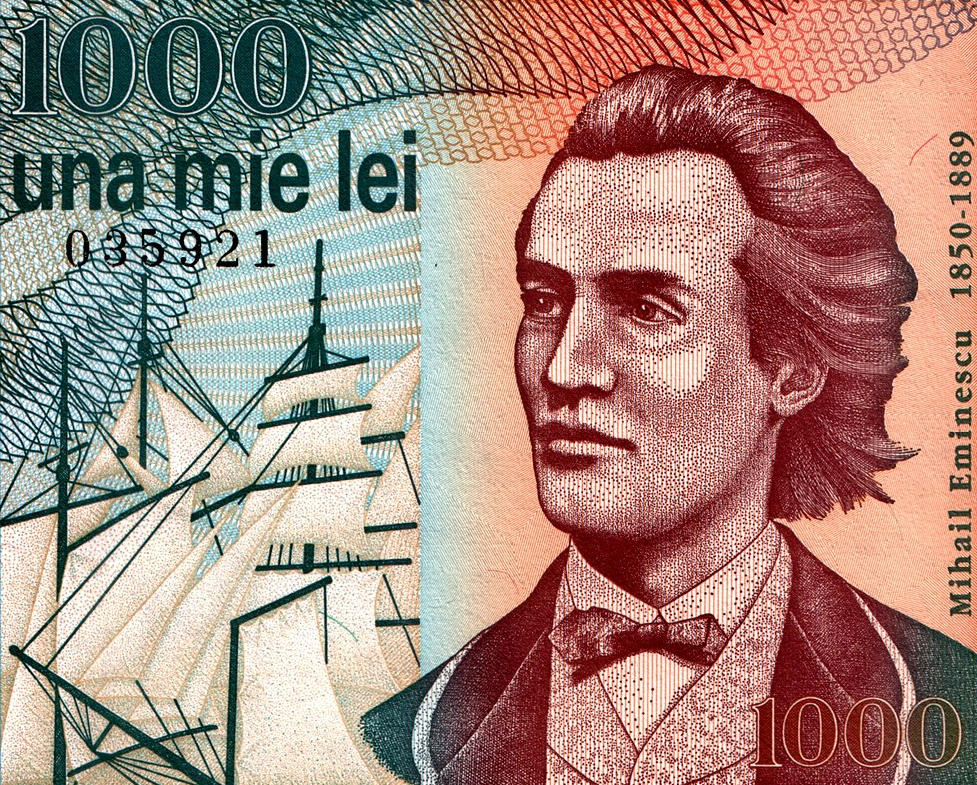
- Eminescu alongside masts, detail of a 1991 1,000-lei banknote
- Original title: Dintre sute de catarge
- Translator: Various
- Written: 1880
- First published in: Poeziĭ postume
- Country: Kingdom of Romania
- Language: Romanian
- Series: Postume
- Genre: Lyrical poetry
- Rhyme scheme: abab
- Publisher: Editura Minerva
- Lines: 16

Full text
- ro:Dintre sute de catarge at Wikisource

"Out of All the Masts" (also rendered as "From the Multitude of Masts", "Of the Masts" or "Of All the Ships"; Romanian: Dintre sute de catarge, literally "Of the Hundreds of Masts") is an 1880 philosophical poem by Mihai Eminescu, Romania's national poet. Written in a condensed, four-stanza format, with a very tight rhyming sequence which makes it notoriously hard to translate, it is widely seen as a small masterpiece in Romanian literature. Its central metaphor, of sailing ships and migratory birds heading out into a naturally perilous journey, constitutes a reflection on entropy, which, over the last lines, builds up into a summary of ontological idealism; Eminescu urges his readers to identify entropy as a guiding law of existence, and to recognize their own thoughts as imperfect echoes from a superior level of reality. The kenning of "winds" and "waves" as stand-ins for generic fate is presumed to originate with similar usage in Romanian folklore, using "time" instead of "waves". Eminescu's reliance on maritime imagery, which was largely absent from Romanian poetry up to that point, may be an indirect record of his trips to Northern Dobruja in the late 1870s.

Eminescu allowed a selection of his poems to be published during his lifetime, but it did not include "Out of All the Masts"—which, in the handwritten version, had no exact title. He preserved the poem, as well as two early versions of it, in his private notebooks, which exegetes discovered and named after his death. The piece was first printed in 1902, and received with enthusiasm by Eminescu's disciple, Alexandru Vlahuță, by their former rival Alexandru Macedonski, as well as by literary critic Garabet Ibrăileanu; the latter fought to make it a standard of all Eminescu editions. The title and metaphor were revived in Communist Romania and Soviet Moldavia as a literary reference to aspiring youth. Its more or less faithful translations into international languages gave it a world fame; "Out of All the Masts" was pastiched by authors such as Alexandru Toma, Stella Leonardos, and Ion Hadârcă. It also inspired music by Doru Popovici, Anatol Vieru, and Aleksi Ahoniemi.

== Outline ==
The four-stanza, 16-line poem is introduced by its titular seafaring metaphor:

Dintre sute de catarge
Care lasă malurile,
Câte oare le vor sparge
Vânturile, valurile?

Translation:

Of all the ships the ocean rolls
How many find untimely graves?
Piled high by you upon the shoals,
O, waves and winds, o winds and waves?

—translation by Corneliu M. Popescu, in Popescu (1978), p. 196

The notion is repeated over the following stanza, which explains that migratory birds will not likely return from their voyages, and will be instead brought down by the same winds and waves. The final two stanzas change focus, encouraging the reader to follow the winds and the waves one their thoughts and ideals will have exhausted; the conclusive lines identify one's thinking with the rhythm provided by the sea and the air:

Nențeles rămâne gândul
Ce-ți străbate cânturile,
Zboară vecinic, îngânându-l,
Valurile, vânturile.

Translation:

Never understood the thought is
That the song in wing'd words binds,
Ever floating, far off echoed
By the waves and by the winds.

—translation by Petre Grimm, in Mihai Eminescu, Poems and Prose of Mihai Eminescu, p. 53. Las Vegas: Histria Books, 2019. ISBN 978-1-59211-029-2

== Critical reception ==
=== Language and philosophy ===
Critics such as Traian Păunescu-Ulmu regard "Out of All the Masts" as anticipating later developments in "pure poetry", due to its "impeccable clarity". Various authors have stated their admiration for "Out of All the Masts" in terms of its song-like qualities—himself a poet, Ștefan Iureș summarized its harmonies as "the famous lull" (faimoasa legănare); novelist Mihail Sadoveanu declared himself fascinated by the poem's "internal melody", which, he proposed, was one of the elements showing Eminescu's sudden evolution into a master writer; comparatist Pompiliu Constantinescu argued that "Out of All the Masts", along with Stelele-n cer and other "tiny poems", shows a "musical Eminescu [...], an Eminescu of precious suggestion." A part of the poem's charm in its Romanian original is explained by linguist Alexandru Rosetti as a combination of nasal and liquid consonants, capable of evoking a "melodious and melancholic flow" (melodioasă și melancolică scurgere). Literary historian Theodor Codreanu describes the piece as a "wonder in musical swaying [carried] only by a pure interplay of rhyme and paeon". Critic Alex. Ștefănescu proposes that "Out of All the Masts" is "not simple, as it may seem, but essentialized", with "short lines and obligatory rhymes—versification criteria that seem impossible to abide by." The impression, according to Ștefănescu, is that "this perfect combination of words has long existed in the Romanian language", and Eminescu has "merely dug it up, like an archeologist taking out an amphora."

Ștefănescu sees the work's other main feature as being its interrogative nature, with a didactic purpose: "Interrogative sentences have this uncanny way of generating interest, since humans learn, from their very first years on Earth, that they have an obligation to answer questions posed to them." The overall method is in drawing attention to entropy as understood by the human mind: "the painful idea that any action is carried out with a large number of losses, and, moreover, that and action is uncertain [emphasis in the original]." Among the Eminescu scholars, Tudor Vianu highlighted the national poet's reliance on the second-person singular "whenever he wants to give voice to a generic self." This, Vianu notes, is the case with "Out of All the Masts" and its final stanza. The same fragment is seen by scholar Gheorghe Ceaușescu as sampling one of Eminescu's characteristics, namely his take on the ontological reality of ideas. The particular note struck by "Out of All the Masts" is that the world's own "thought" may not be easily understood by the human intellect, though it can be perceived through the "moving elements of the cosmos".

The implicit message is theorized by linguist Dumitru Irimia: "Eminescu expresses [...] a belief that only the creative act ensures a being's rescue from the prison of ephemeral things, as well as the drama of disbelief in a reader's ability to capture the profound nature of that creative act". Comparatist Elena Loghinovschi proposes that, here as well as in Luceafărul, Eminescu channeled the same sensibility as Russia's Fyodor Tyutchev; they both sense "the omnipresent echoes of the Spirit, those which unite the obscure or prophetic impulses of a human microcosm with the majestic breath of the macrocosm". Eminescu exegete Ion Dumitrescu supports reading "Out of All the Masts" as a companion to another work, Glossă, which is explicitly and "profoundly" indebted to the pessimistic philosophy of Arthur Schopenhauer (and also uses the imagery of waves). This presents as follows:

Vreme trece, vreme vine,
Toate-s vechi și nouă toate;
Ce e rău și ce e bine
Tu te-ntreabă și socoate;
Nu spera și nu ai teamă,
Ce e val ca valul trece;
De te-ndeamnă, de te cheamă,
Tu rămâi la toate rece.

Translation:

Days go past and days come still,
All is old and all is new,
What is well and what is ill,
You imagine and construe;
Do not hope and do not fear,
Waves that leap like waves must fall;
Should they praise or should they jeer,
Look but coldly on it all.

—translation by Corneliu M. Popescu, in Popescu (1978), p. 108

=== Seascape imagery and folkloric source ===
The anguishing tone present in "Out of All the Masts" is also tied by critics to its elements of localization—Eminescu depicts himself as standing on the shore, welcoming the looming tragedy with a sense of "calm disintegration". This marine nature of the poem is a topic for discussion, since it remains uncharacteristic of Romanian poetry; columnist Geo Bogza remarked that "Out of All the Masts" informs the Romanian soul "on fate and shipwrecks", being a poem so evocative that "old nations of seafarers would envy us." As noted by poet Veronica Porumbacu in her brief analysis of this and other literary seascapes, Eminescu had rarely visited seafaring areas, and never spent any time on the local Black Sea coast. Comparatist László Gáldi contrarily believes that Eminescu made numerous trips to maritime Northern Dobruja after its annexation in 1878, and that he became "obsessed" with the imagery of sea-waves—producing not just "Out of All the Masts", but also "One Wish Alone Have I". Some exegetes read the sea in purely metaphorical terms, as a simile, with Magdalena Popescu noting that it stands for "an absurd social life, which renders creativity obsolete and moral rectitude useless". According to Dumitrescu, the sea and its waves should be regarded as a metaphor for life itself.

Gáldi argues that, beyond its philosophical worth, "Out of All the Masts" is a stylistic homage to Romanian folklore. As he notes, Eminescu may have picked up on very specific influences from the Mocani songs (doine) of Transylvania while out partying at Kiriazi Inn with Dumitru Constantinescu-Teleormăneanu and others. He identifies a lyrical motif shared between Eminescu's piece and one such folk creation, which reads:

Jelui-m-aș și n-am cui
Jelui-m-aș codrului;
Codru-i jalnic ca și mine
Că nici frunza nu-i rămâne,
Numai grele clomburele
Să le bată vânturi grele,
Vremurile, vânturile,
Ca pe mine gândurile.

Translation:

I would mourn myself, I would,
I would wail out in the wood,
But the woods are weak, like me,
With leaves falling off each tree,
And with boughs that stay instead,
For the winds to have to shed;
Winds are heavy, so is time,
Heavy like these thoughts of mine.

According to Gáldi, the transition from folk lament to modern philosophy, with "time" replaced by "waves", is made obvious through intermediary versions of the poem. The earliest variants include mention of the poetic self, while in the final one Eminescu "expurgates any reference to his own person, addressing himself with a gnomic tone and with an absolute impartiality". One such intermediary piece, found in Eminescu's unpublished notebooks, reads:

Văd corăbii părăsite
Ce-și lăsară malurile;
Să le bată sunt ursite
Vânturile, valurile

Translation:

O, I see seafaring vessels
With the oceans as their graves;
They are but the fate that wrestles
With the winds, and with the waves.

== Publication history and cultural echoes ==
=== National appraisal ===
"Out of All the Masts" and all its non-definitive variants are dated to 1880; the piece carried no title, and was named by scholars after its first line. For unknown reasons, it and other such manuscript pieces were never proposed for printing by Eminescu himself—though, as literary historian Nicolae Manolescu notes, "they are in no way inferior to the idylls and elegies that [...] made it into [his] 1883 volume." The piece was only published posthumously, in the April 1902 selection put out by Editura Minerva (as Poeziĭ postume). It was offered an enthusiastic reception by Eminescu disciple Alexandru Vlahuță: "The master seems to be walking among us [...]. We read [these lines], and our soul is stirred as if by a familiar voice, one we had not heard in a long time, one we thought we would never hear again—a beloved voice, a saintly voice, speaking to us from eternity." The series, known simply as Postume, was again published in 1905, by Ilarie Chendi, whose critical introduction showed a decline in enthusiasm. Chendi described it as the work of a "young, imperfect, unedited" Eminescu. According to oral history, the poem was well-liked by the longtime Eminescu rival, Alexandru Macedonski, whose Symbolist pupils showed him the piece, introducing it as the work of a young man. When confronted with the truth, Macedonski allegedly said: Păi eu n-am spus niciodată că Eminescu nu are și unele bucăți destul de curățele ("Well I never said that Eminescu doesn't have his own rather more polished pieces").

The last lines of "Out of All the Masts" were engraved on a commemorative monument, erected by politician Leon Ghica on his estate in Dumbrăveni—which, in the early 20th century, was erroneously regarded by many as Eminescu's birthplace. The poem continued to be dropped out of Eminescu editions into the interwar, but its inclusion and appreciation were advocated by critic Garabet Ibrăileanu, who saw it as part of the Eminescu standard. Speaking in 1936, the post-Symbolist poet Tudor Arghezi reportedly used "Out of All the Masts" to evidence the "mystery" of a poet's craft:

The idea in the [first] stanza is so banal that it borders on the ridiculous. What are we told here? That from the ships that sail out at sea, many will go under. Is it a poem only because it has rhythm and rhyme? Here, let me write down four lines that carry the same idea. [...] Is what I just recited a poem? No, no it isn't. And then why isn't this work of mine a poem and Eminescu's is? Now that's a mystery. It's a secret with those words matching, something that sends you off into ecstasy.

"Out of All the Masts" and its titular metaphor enjoyed a revival during the age of Romanian communism (1948–1989). The work was recited at the Eminescu Centennial of 1950 by actor Ludovic Antal, who thus made his debut as a permanent fixture of Eminescu festivals. Around then, it also received an optimistic rewrite by the poet-laureate of socialist realism, Alexandru Toma, whom Eminescu scholars had grown to despise; at one public function in February 1950, scholar George Călinescu recited with noted gusto from Eminescu, while going into a "gnashing" mode when having to quote Toma's version. The latter read:

Câte sute de catarge
Dârze lasă malurile,
Mult sunt ce nu le-or sparge
Vânturile, valurile.

Duc belșug, solii de viață
Și străbat pământurile,
Ști-vor înfrunta prin ceață
Valurile, vânturile.

Translation:

Out of the many hundreds of masts
Courageously parting with the shoreline,
Many shall not be broken
By the winds, by the waves.

They carry wealth, errands of life
And reach across the lands,
Many shall know how to face through the fog
The waves, the winds.

By 1954, Doru Popovici was performing his own Lied based on the original poem. Later that decade, Mihu Dragomir published in Luceafărul a column showcasing debuting talents, which used Eminescu's line as a title—in order to highlight editorial uncertainties about their public reception. The opening line, Dintre sute de catarge, was also the title of a 1961 novel by Haralamb Zincă, depicting the struggles and failures of wartime resisters. The same name and its repurposing as a metaphor for creative youth appeared among Romanian writers in the Moldavian SSR and Chernivtsi Oblast (both in the Soviet Union). In 1973, a poetry collection titled Dintre sute de catarge appeared at Chișinău; it is noted for featuring works by Ilie Motrescu, who had been mysteriously killed in 1969.

During the latter stage of Romanian communism, Toma's optimistic rewrite came to be openly derided, whereas Eminescu's original was more readily accepted as a work of genius. In a 1988 commentary on socialist patriotism, actor Gheorghe Cozorici spoke of Toma's poem as "declaratory and boastful", an affront toward the "authentically revolutionary spirit". Dintre sute de catarge was adopted as the name of an amateur troupe, set up by workers of the Mangalia shipyard (1977), and was also taken up by a literary club in Țibănești (1983). The year 1989, which marked a century since Eminescu's death, saw the release of a commemorative medal that quotes two lines of "Out of All the Masts" (this item was created by a group of artists including Ștefan Grudinschi); Anatol Vieru's Sixth Symphony, first performed that year, is reportedly designed to accommodate a singing rendition of the Eminescu piece. The relaunch of modernist literature in the 1960s also gave way to pastiche and parody; this issue was covered with annoyance by writer D. I. Suchianu, who cited as a poor sample of poetry one in which an unnamed author "associated himself" with Eminescu:

Dintre sute de pedale
care-ncing șoselele...

Translation:

Of all the hundreds of pedals
heating up the roads...

=== International fame ===
The prosody makes "Out of All the Masts" hard to render in other languages, with noted exceptions being the German version provided by Maximilian W. Schroff, and the Hungarian one, by Zoltán Jékely; Loghinovschi also reserves some praise for the main Russian version, as penned by Yuri Kozhevnikov. Nicolae Sulică rendered the piece into Latin for his 1920s magazine Incitamentum. A Polish version of the poem was proposed in the 1920s or 1930s by Dusza Czara-Stec, but was criticized by Rodica Ciocan-Ivănescu, herself a translator of Polish, for being "amateurish". Another Polish rendition, Przez fale przez zawieje ("Through the Waves, through the Blizzards"), was completed by Emil Zegadłowicz and published in 1933, ten years ahead of Božena Șesan's second German version. A pentalingual edition of Eminescu, featuring contributions by Schroff and Suchianu, appeared at Editura Albatros in 1971, and included more or less precise versions of "Out of All the Masts". Jékely's Hungarian translation appeared independently, as part of a 1974 edition at Európa Kiadó of Budapest. In January 2011, the Romanian Cultural Institute of Budapest celebrated Eminescu's birthday by sending out emails with four Hungarian versions of "Out of All the Masts"—respectively penned by Jékely, Zoltán Franyó, Sándor Kányádi, and Sándor Kacsó.

By 1973, a Portuguese translation had been penned by Stella Leonardos of Brazil, who also published an intertextual fragment mixing her own work with some of the poem's lyrics. Omar Lara, who had spent time as a Chilean political exile in Romania, translated Eminescu's poem into Spanish; it appeared in 2007 in a special-issue of Lara's magazine, Trilce. A Finnish version, produced in 1996 by Liisa Ryömä, came with a musical arrangement by Aleksi Ahoniemi. With the emergence of a second Romanian-speaking state as post-Soviet Moldova, poet-politician Ion Hadârcă embraced both Romanian nationalism and Eminescu-like melancholia. By 2001, he had authored a free-verse pastiche of "Out of All the Masts", which, according to Irimia, outlines an implicit home in the survival of Romanian identity:

Dintre sutele de catarguri [sic]
este unul
care este și unicul
ales dintre miile sutele

Translation:

From the hundreds of masts
there's one
one that's also the only one
picked out of thousands of hundreds
