= ICF =

ICF may refer to:

== Business ==
- ICF International, an American consulting firm
- Integral Coach Factory, an Indian manufacturer of rail coaches in Chennai
  - ICF coach
- International Cablemakers Federation
- International Cremation Federation
- FIDE, whose English name is ICF (International Chess Federation)

== Government organizations ==
- ICF Colony, a neighbourhood of Chennai associated with the Integral Coach Factory
- Intermediate Care Facility, provider of residential care
- Institut Català de Finances, a public financial institution owned by the Government of Catalonia

== Non-profit organizations ==
- International Curling Federation, a former name for the World Curling Federation
- Inter City Firm, a "hooligan firm" associated with West Ham United F.C.
- Inter-School Christian Fellowship
- International Canoe Federation, the world governing body for canoe and kayak sports
- International Carrom Federation, the governing body for the sport of carrom
- International Christian Fellowship, Sapporo, a church in Sapporo
- International Christian Fellowship, a church based in Zurich, Switzerland
- International Coaching Federation, dedicated to professional coaching
- Irish Cycling Federation
- Island Corridor Foundation, a Canadian non-profit railway company

== Science and technology ==
- Idiopathic chronic fatigue
- Immunodeficiency, centromere instability and facial anomalies syndrome
- Inertial confinement fusion, a means of achieving nuclear fusion
- Informed consent form, a document for obtaining informed consent of a patient
- Insulating concrete form, a construction technique
- Integrated Coupling Facility, a Coupling Facility on IBM mainframe computers
- International Classification of Functioning, Disability and Health, a classification of health and functioning
- Internet Connection Firewall, the firewall in Windows XP
- Intracellular fluid, body fluid contained in cells (as opposed to extracellular fluid)
- International Congress on Fracture, an international body for fracture in materials and fracture-related topics
- Inverted cone filtration, a process used to remove particulate and dissolved contaminants from a designated fluid
