= Luceafărul (poem) =

1883 narrative poem by Mihai Eminescu

- by Mihai Eminescu
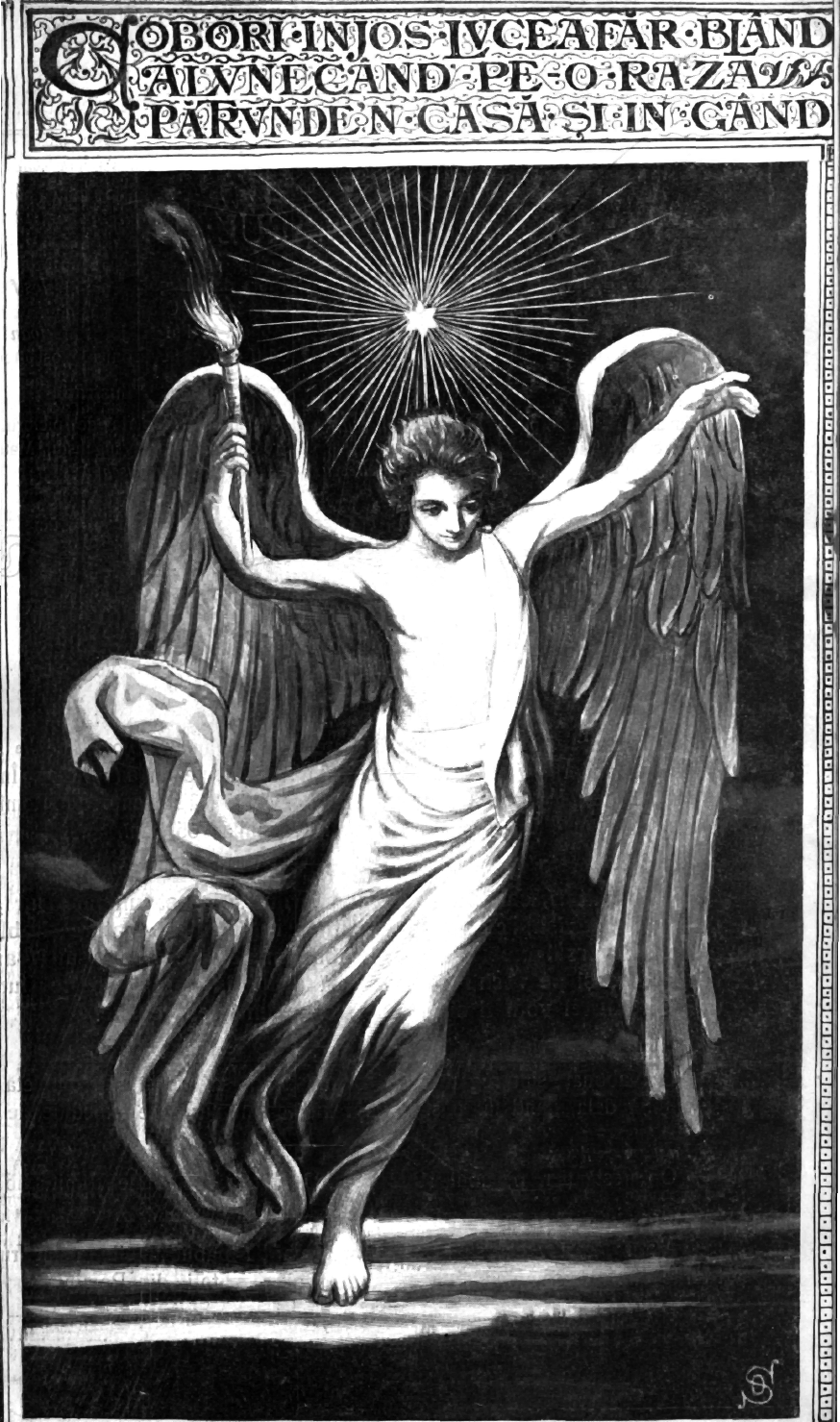
- Octavian Smigelschi's vision of the Morning Star, with lyrics from the 13th stanza; 1904 print in the eponymous magazine
- Original title: Luceafĕrul or Legenda Luceafĕrului
- Translator: Leon Levițchi
- Written: 1873–1883
- First published in: Almanachulŭ Societății Academice Socialŭ-Literare Romănia Jună
- Country: Kingdom of Romania (authorship); Austria-Hungary (publication)
- Language: Romanian
- Series: "Luceafărul constellation"
- Subject: philosophy of love
- Genre(s): narrative poetry mythopoeia
- Meter: iambic tetrameter, iambic trimeter
- Rhyme scheme: abab
- Publication date: April 1883
- Published in English: 1978
- Lines: 392

Full text
- ro:Luceafărul (Eminescu) at Wikisource

Luceafărul (originally spelled Luceafĕrul according to obsolete norms; pronunciation: [luˈtʃe̯afərul]; variously rendered as "The Morning Star", "The Evening Star", "The Vesper", "The Daystar", or "Lucifer") is a narrative poem by Romanian author Mihai Eminescu. It was first published in 1883, out of Vienna, by Romanian expatriates in Austria-Hungary. It is generally considered Eminescu's masterpiece, one of the greatest accomplishments in Romanian literature, and one of the last milestones in Europe's romantic poetry. One in a family or "constellation" of poems, it took Eminescu ten years to conceive, its final shape being partly edited by the philosopher Titu Maiorescu. During this creative process, Eminescu distilled Romanian folklore, Romantic themes, and various staples of Indo-European myth, arriving from a versified fairy tale to a mythopoeia, a self-reflection on his condition as a genius, and an illustration of his philosophy of love.

The eponymous celestial being, also referred to as "Hyperion", is widely identified as Eminescu's alter ego; he combines elements of fallen angels, daimons, incubi, but is neither mischievous nor purposefully seductive. His daily mission on the firmament is interrupted by the calls of Princess Cătălina, who asks for him to "glide down" and become her mate. He is persuaded by her to relinquish his immortality, which would require approval from a third protagonist, the Demiurge. The Morning Star seeks the Demiurge at the edge of the Universe, but only receives a revelation of mankind's irrelevancy. In his brief absence, the Princess is seduced by a fellow mortal. As he returns to his place in the sky, Hyperion understands that the Demiurge was right.

Luceafărul enjoys fame not just as a poetic masterpiece, but also as one of the last works completed and read publicly by Eminescu before his debilitating mental illness and hospitalization. It has endured in cultural memory as both the object of critical scrutiny and a strong favorite of the public. Its translators into various languages include figures such as Rafael Alberti, Günther Deicke, Zoltán Franyó, Mite Kremnitz, Omar Lara, Leon Levițchi, Mate Maras, Corneliu M. Popescu, David Samoylov, Immanuel Weissglas, Todur Zanet, and Vilém Závada. The poem left a distinct legacy in literary works by Mircea Eliade, Emil Loteanu, Alexandru Vlahuță, and, possibly, Ingeborg Bachmann. It has also inspired composers Nicolae Bretan and Eugen Doga, as well as various visual artists.

== Outline ==
Luceafărul opens as a typical fairy tale, with a variation of "once upon a time" and a brief depiction of its female character, a "wondrous maiden", the only child of a royal couple—her name, Cătălina, will only be mentioned once, in the poem's 46th stanza. She is shown waiting impatiently for nightfall, when she gazes upon the Morning Star:

Din umbra falnicelor bolți
Ea pasul și-l îndreaptă
Lângă fereastră, unde-n colț
Luceafărul așteaptă.

Privea în zare cum pe mări
Răsare și străluce,
Pe mișcătoarele cărări
Corăbii negre duce.

Translation:

From 'neath the castle's dark retreat,
Her silent way she wended,
Each evening to the window seat
Where Lucifer attended.

And secretly, with never fail,
She watched his gracious pace,
Where vessels drew their pathless trail
Across the ocean's face.

—translation by Corneliu M. Popescu,
quoted in Kenneth Katzner, The Languages of the World, p. 113. London etc.: Routledge, 2002. ISBN 0-415-25004-8

Hyperion senses her attention and gazes back, and, although a non-physical entity, also begins to desire her company. Sliding through her window when she is asleep, he caresses Cătălina as she dreams of him. In one such a moment, she moans for him to "glide down upon a ray" and become her betrothed. Urged on by this command, the Morning Star hurls himself into the sea, reemerging as a "fair youth", or "handsome corpse with living eyes".

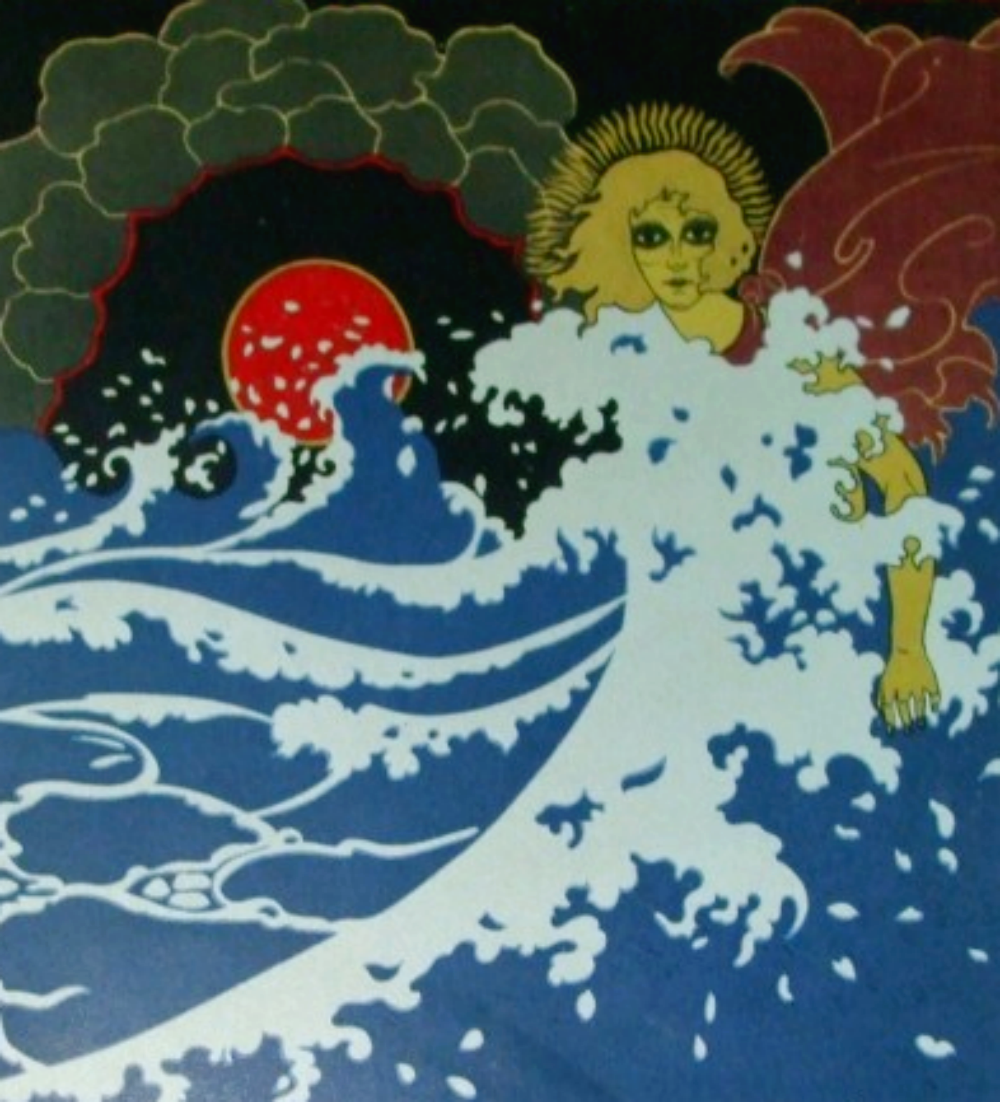
Mișu Teișanu's chromolithography for Luceafărul (1923 edition), 15th stanza. Appearing as a "fair youth", the Morning Star reemerges from the sea to meet with his admirer Cătălina.

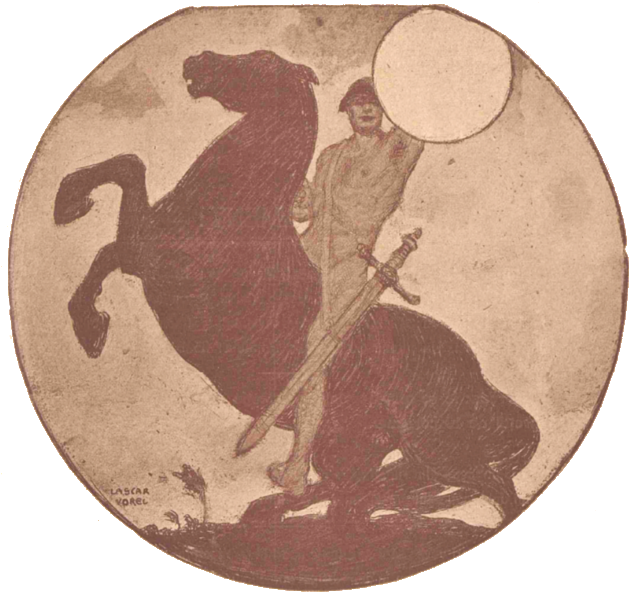
The Morning Star as a sword-bearing youth, 1904 lithograph by Lascăr Vorel

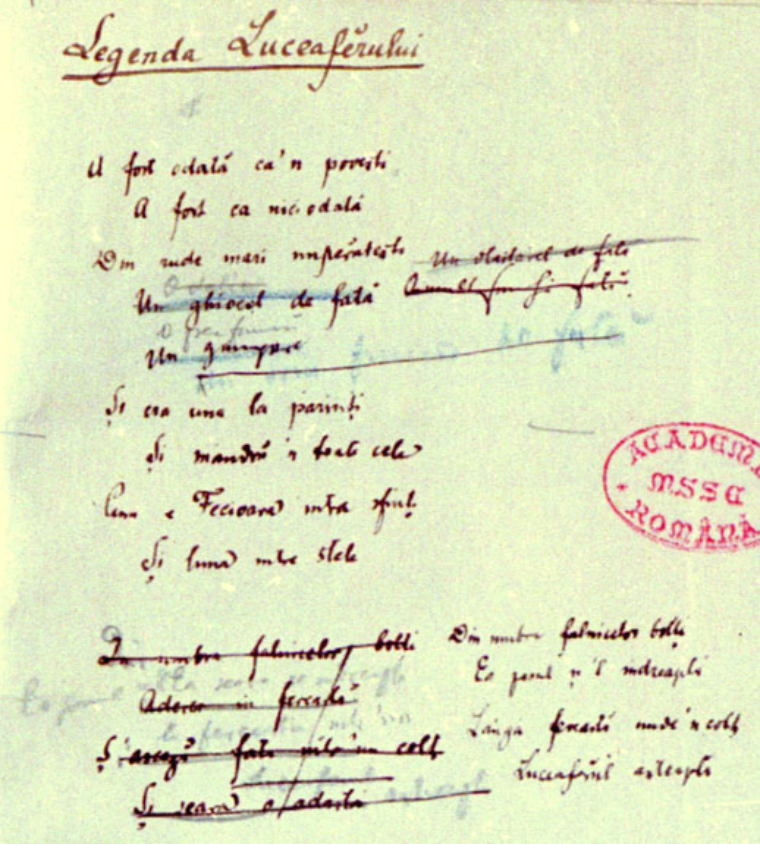
First stanzas of Legenda Luceafĕrului in Eminescu's handwriting, 1882

Returning to Cătălina while she is awake, Hyperion proposes that they elope to his "coral castles" at the bottom of the sea; this horrifies the Princess, who expresses her refusal of a "lifeless" and "alien" prospect—although she still appears bedazzled by his "angel" looks. However, within days she returns to dreaming of the Morning Star and unconsciously asking for him to "glide down". This time, he appears to her a creature of fire, offering Cătălina a place in his celestial abode. She again expresses her refusal, and compares Hyperion's new form to that of a daimon. In this restated form, her refusal reads:

— „O, ești frumos, cum numa-n vis
Un demon se arată,
Dară pe calea ce-ai deschis
N-oi merge niciodată [...]”

Translation:

"You are as handsome as in sleep
Can but a d[a]emon be;
Yet never shall I take and keep
The path you show to me."

—translation by Leon Levițchi, in Prickett, p. 237 (using "daemon"); in Săndulescu, p. 16 (has "demon").

Cătălina is not interested in acquiring immortality, but asks that he join the mortal realm, to be "reborn in sin"; Hyperion agrees, and to this end abandons his place on the firmament to seek out the Demiurge. This requires him to travel to the edge of the Universe, into a cosmic void. Once there, the Demiurge laughs off his request; he informs Hyperion that human experience is futile, and that becoming human would be a return to "yesterday's eternal womb". He orders Hyperion back to his celestial place, obliquely telling him that something "in store" on Earth will prove the point.

Indeed, while Hyperion was missing, Cătălina had found herself courted, then slowly seduced, by a "conniving" courtly page, Cătălin. The poem's "tragic denouement allots each of the three lovers their own sphere with frontiers impossible to trespass." As he resumes his place on the firmament, Hyperion catches sight of the happy couple Cătălin and Cătălina. She gazes back and calls on him, but only as a witness to, and good-luck charm for, her new love. The last two stanzas show Hyperion returning to his silent, self-absorbed, activities:

Dar nu mai cade ca-n trecut
În mări din tot înaltul
— „Ce-ți pasă ție, chip de lut,
Dac-oi fi eu sau altul?

Trăind în cercul vostru strâmt
Norocul vă petrece,
Ci eu în lumea mea mă simt
Nemuritor și rece.”

Translation:

Yet he no more, as yesterday,
Falls down into the sea;
"What dost thou care, o shape of clay,
If it is I or he?

You live accompanied by weal
In your all-narrow fold,
Whilst in my boundless world I feel
Both deathless and dead cold."

—translation by Levițchi, in Prickett, p. 249; in Săndulescu, p. 25.

== Publication history ==
As noted by the editor Perpessicius, during the interwar a "most absurd" urban legend had spread, according to which Eminescu had written the poem on the night train taking him to Bucharest. In fact, several drafts of the poem exist, some as long as the finished piece. Perpessicius rates these as "standalone types" and, in 1938, opted to publish them as separate pieces in his companion to Eminescu's work, with philologist Petru Creția calling them the "Luceafărul constellation". Its earliest recognizable component is Fata-n grădina de aur ("Girl in the Garden of Gold"), written c. 1873, when Eminescu was in Berlin. It was the ottava rima version of a Romanian folklore prose-piece—retrieved by the Silesian Richard Kunisch and published in 1861 Das Mädchen im goldenen Garten. The source was cryptically identified as "the German K." in Eminescu's notebooks, and the bibliographic information was pieced together by Moses Gaster.

Entire portions of the later poem also surface in another piece of the period. Called Peste codri stă cetatea ("Over the Woods There Stands a City"), it briefly depicts the Princess dreaming of her chosen one, the Morning Star. Eminescu made several discreet returns to his drafts, adding the central theme of the Hyperion as a misunderstood genius, and finally in April 1882 went public with Legenda Luceafĕrului ("Legend of the Morning Star"). He was in Bucharest as a guest of the Junimea society, where he read out the variant on April 17; he then worked closely with its doyen Titu Maiorescu, who helped him with critical insight. During these exchanges, the work acquired its celebrated final stanza. There followed a second reading on April 24, when, in his diaries, Maiorescu recorded the "beautiful legend" simply as Luceafărul.

Maiorescu endorsed the work and promoted it with public readings in both Bucharest and Buftea, lasting into January 1883, and attended by Eminescu, Petre P. Carp, Alexandru B. Știrbei, and Ioan Slavici. First published in Almanachulŭ Societății Academice Socialŭ-Literare Romănia Jună, put out by the Romanian colony of Vienna in April 1883, it was taken up in August by the Junimist tribune, Convorbiri Literare. At some point in this interval, Eminescu had fallen terminally ill, and was sent to an Oberdöbling asylum for treatment. Around November 1883, as he began work on a first edition of Eminescu's collected poems, Maiorescu decided to cut out four stanzas—those detailing negotiations between Hyperion and Demiurge—, in an effort to improve flow. This puzzled later editors: in his own volume, Garabet Ibrăileanu kept the omission, but included the missing part as an appendix, while D. R. Mazilu hesitated between the versions in his search for an "ideal" and "purified" Luceafărul.

In terms of vocabulary and linguistic purism, scholar Iorgu Iordan assessed that three out of 98 Luceafărul stanzas have words of exclusively old-layer Latin provenance, with some 30 additional stanzas featuring only one or two non-Latin words. Running at 392 lines in its unabridged version, the work alternates iambic tetrameter and iambic trimeter. This is an old pattern in Romanian poetry, previously observed in Dosoftei's preamble to Erofili, and is described by critic Alex Ștefănescu as "lapidary, enunciative, solemn in its simplicity." The rhythmic sequencing has created a long-standing dilemma about the intended pronunciation of Hyperion: while common Romanian phonology favors Hypérion, the text suggests that Eminescu used Hyperión. Artistic license also surfaces in the apparent pleonasm, with which Cătălina beckons Hyperion: Cobori în jos, luceafăr blând ("Descend down, gentle Morning Star"). Some Eminescu exegetes see here an intellectual stress on the separation between the realms, breached by "divine descent into humanity", or the repetition one associates with incantation.

== Themes and allusions ==
=== Mythology ===
The versified story is so indebted to folklore that, according to Perpessicius, it should be published alongside those works of folk poetry which Eminescu himself collected and kept. Nevertheless, the same author concedes that Eminescu ultimately "fashioned his own ornaments" from the folkloric level, producing an "intensely original" work. These "ornaments" include: "the iambic rhythms of his stanzas, the images, the enchanting celestial voyage, the dialogue between Hyperion and the Demiurge, [and Cătălin], who seems to have been lifted out of a subtle comedy by Marivaux". Likewise, critic C. Gerota sees Eminescu's poem as a "great work of art" emerging "from Kunisch's prosaic fairy tale"; "only the form" is folkloric. An Aarne–Thompson inventory, proposed by the scholar Dumitru Caracostea, finds that Eminescu essentially refashioned the myth of Animal Bride. The fairy or samodiva became the daimon—within a narrative rearranged by Eminescu and, to some extent, by Kunisch. Caracostea rejects as too narrow the interpretations advanced by Gheorghe Bogdan-Duică, according to whom Luceafărul was directly inspired by Lithuanian mythology—namely, by the story of Saulė's revenge on Aušrinė.

In various ways, Luceafărul has connections with the fallen angel motif in Christian mythology. Mythographer Victor Kernbach notes that the name was already used in folkloric sources for the demon Lucifer, or for a localized version of Samyaza. As described by the Eminescu scholar Gisèle Vanhese, Luceafărul is not just "Eminescu's masterpiece", but also "the achievement of Romantic reflection regarding the Sons of Darkness." The latter category of folkloric beings, themselves probably derived from fallen angels, includes the Zburători, which act as the Romanian equivalent of incubi. Their visitation of young girls at night also echoes more distant themes from Ancient Greek mythology, such as Zeus' seduction of Semele and Io, or the story of Cupid and Psyche—the latter was one of Eminescu's favorite references. The Zburători's most elaborate depiction in Romantic poetry was an eponymous 1830s piece by Ion Heliade Rădulescu, but they also show up in the works of Constantin Stamati and Constantin Negruzzi.

Variations of the theme, and more direct echoes from Lord Byron (Heaven and Earth) and Victor Hugo ("The Sylph"), appear in various early poems by Eminescu, and in some portions of the "constellation". Zburători are directly mentioned in the draft poem Peste codri stă cetatea—although, in later intermediary versions, the incubus had been a Zmeu, and the Demiurge had been called "Adonai". As seen by Vanhese, the Morning Star is a syntheses of incubi (he appears to Cătălina in her dreams) and Lucifer (with whom he shares the celestial attribute). She argues that, with Eminescu's poem, "the myth of the Romantic demon reaches its most accomplished expression in European culture", equaled in visual arts by Mikhail Vrubel's Demon Seated.

Myths synthesized by Eminescu; late- or post-Romantic depictions
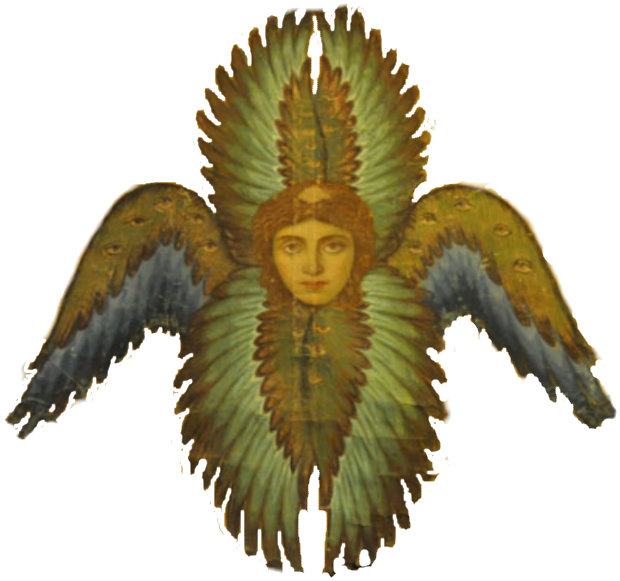
Angel (seraph), by Octavian Smigelschi (1903)

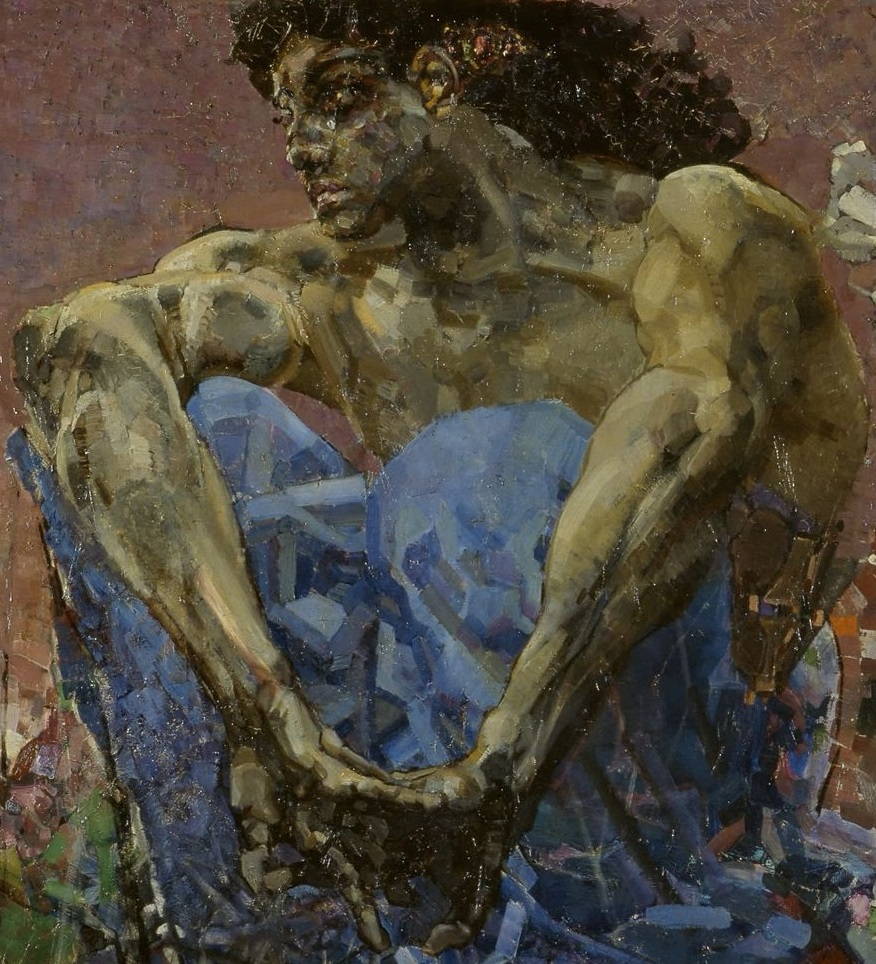
Demon Seated, by Mikhail Vrubel (1890)

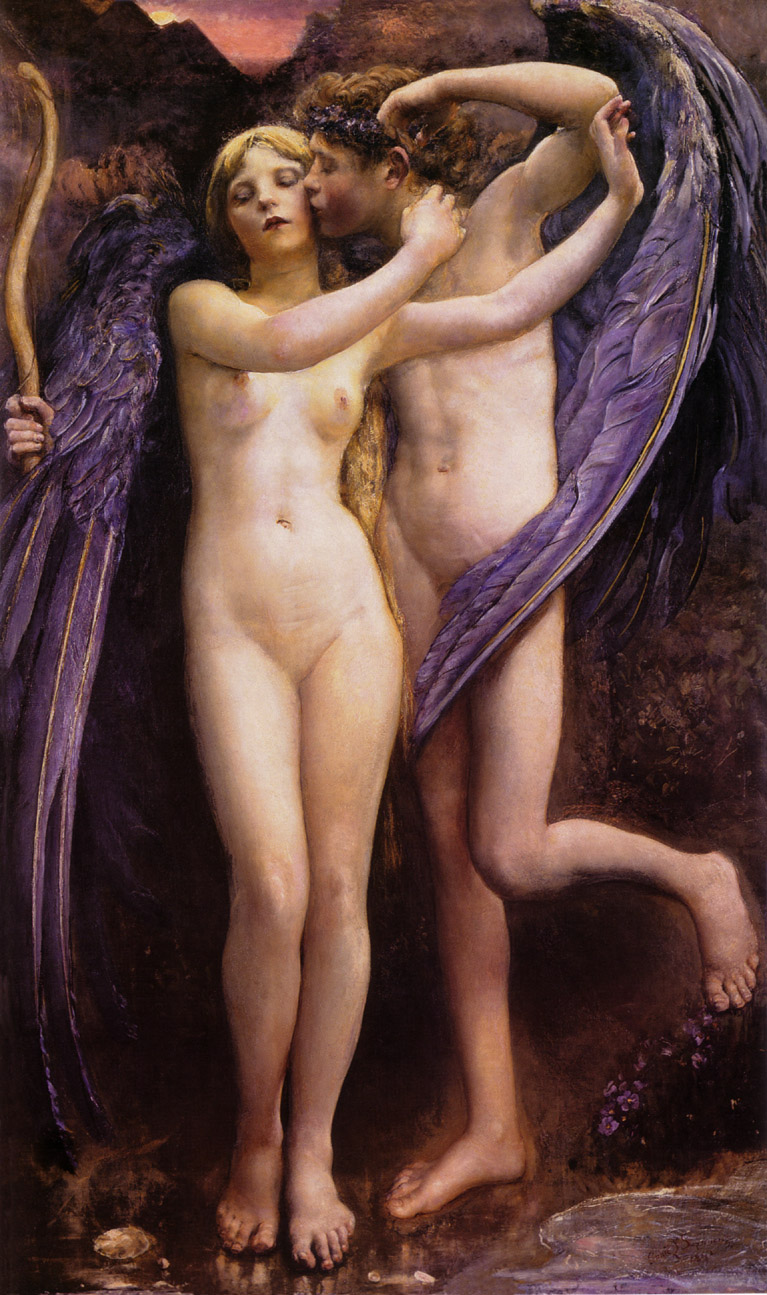
Cupid and Psyche, by Annie Swynnerton (1891)

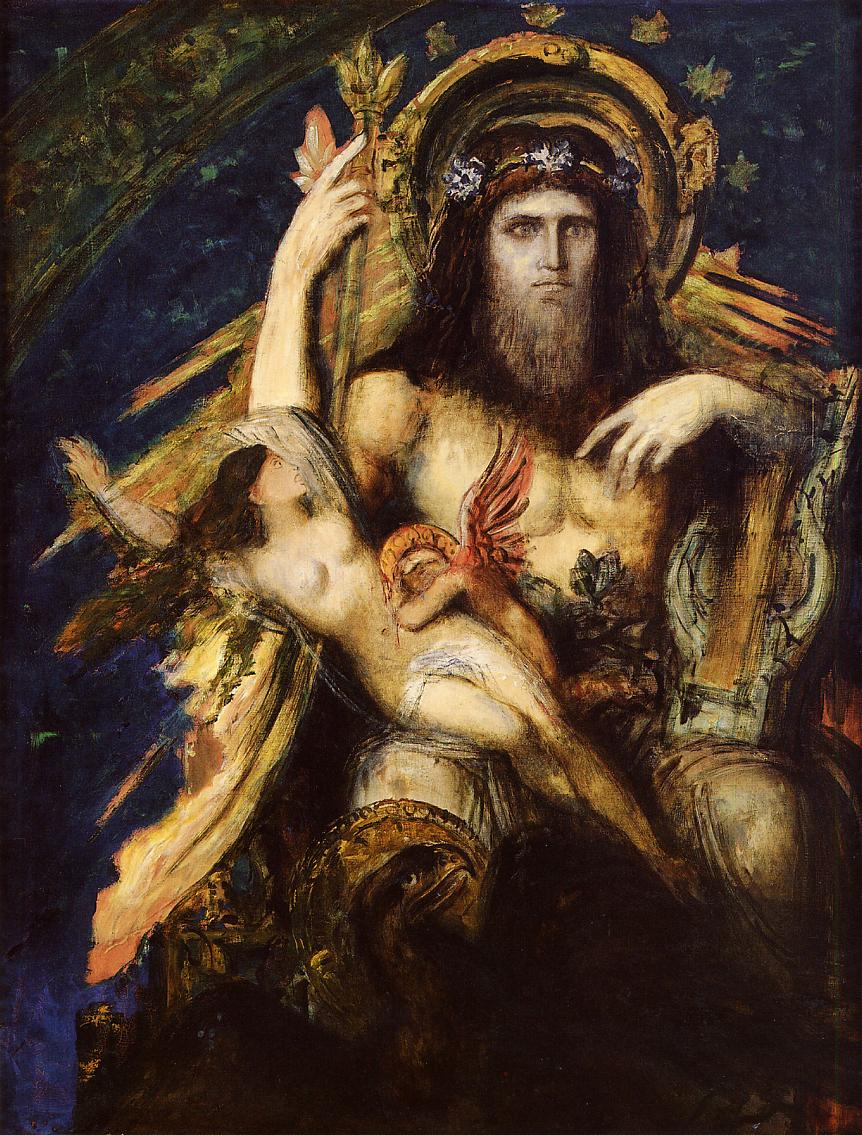
Jupiter and Semele, by Gustave Moreau (ca. 1890)

This contrasts readings by Caracostea and Tudor Vianu, who see the Morning Star as primarily angelic—if he appears "handsome as a daemon" during his second incarnation, it is because passion has momentarily transfigured him. Comparatist Pompiliu Constantinescu assumes a similar stance, whereby the daimon is "pacified by the supreme awareness of his superior essence." While noting that Eminescu had a great interest in Lucifer as a literary trope, mythographer Ioan Petru Culianu asserts that the Morning Star is only incidentally related to the fallen angels myth, and more than anything a Romanian Hesperus.

Composite in inspiration, the Morning Star as a male god is an original creation by Eminescu. The transition to this ultimate form was eased by lexical precedent: in Romanian, the Morning and Evening Stars are gendered male, and "the biblical notion of Lucifer" was already being confounded in folklore with either celestial body. In folk sources, the celestial identification is also incomplete: generally used for Venus, the name Luceafărul may transfer to Jupiter, "whichever is more prominent at dusk." In describing his new deity, Eminescu apparently assigned him an original attribute, detailed in the 5th stanza: he is the god of seafarers, dragging their ships across the ocean. This metaphor alludes to celestial navigation. Astronomers Alastair McBeath and A. D. Gheorghe focus on another connection, seeing Hyperion as a component of "meteor mythology", alongside shapeshifting Balauri. They also argue that Hyperion's "rapid flight" back to Earth alludes to the Eta Aquariids, and that the celestial void from which he takes flight is a black hole.

Mystery subsists as to why Eminescu opted to give his Morning Star the unrelated moniker "Hyperion", which references the Titans of Greek mythology. Philologist Rodica Marian argues that the Morning Star only acquires the name, and learns his true nature, upon meeting the Demiurge. Several experts are in agreement that, in choosing "Hyperion", Eminescu alluded to a folk etymology, which gives hyper+aeon ("above timelessness"). As noted by the anthologist Stephen Prickett, the name itself "points to the immortal condition of the male protagonist". Caracostea has a dissenting opinion, arguing that the meaning is literally "superior being", selected by Eminescu from a 1799 novel by Friedrich Hölderlin. By contrast, the two mortals have distinctively local, Christian and folksy, names, akin to Katherine.

=== Philosophy of love ===
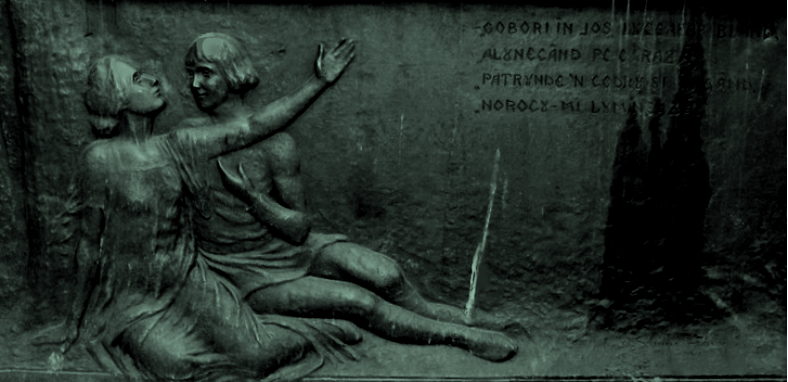
Ion Schmidt-Faur's depiction of Cătălin and Cătălina, 1929

The personal mythology of Luceafărul is overall a poetic rendition of a personal philosophy of love. Caracostea proposes that Eminescu had special reason to dwell on the poem, which must therefore express "a fundamental experience". This is not the case for other ideas he borrowed from Kunisch, which merely resulted in conventional pieces such as "Miron and The Disembodied Beauty". The "allegorical meaning" is explained by Eminescu's own comment: "[genius] is immortal, but lacks good fortune." The result, according to scholar Geo Vasile, is Eminescu's "triumph in the world of ideas": "Here, the Albatross-poet extends his wings in all their magnificent reach."

As noted by Lovinescu, the entire project is "suffused with Schopenhauerian pessimism"; according to Gerota, Eminescu's text is Schopenhauerian, but beyond that inspired by Alfred de Vigny's "Moses"—although Luceafărul "rises up to an allegorical form, with greater reach and livelier content." The Schopenhauerian influence is nuanced by Caracostea, who notes that the four stanzas cut out by Maiorescu were this-worldly and optimistic: the Demiurge denies Hyperion sheer mortality, but offers to make him a leader of men; the implication is that such figures are superhuman.

Beyond this context, some have identified a larger meditation on the human condition. Classicist Cicerone Poghirc argued that Luceafărul is about the unbridgeable separation imposed by dharma, which Eminescu had read about in the Katha Upanishad. Likewise, comparatist Rosa del Conte sees the work as the "lyrical solving of a metaphysical intuition—about the transcendence which doesn't allow man neither to live, nor to be". In her reading, Luceafărul is on a philosophical continuum with other Eminescian poetry; the metaphor of "time as death" first appears in relation to Hyperion's withdrawal, and is fully developed in the posthumous "Memento Mori: The Panorama of Vanities". According to Marian, who criticizes traditional scholarship and relies on insights from Constantin Noica, the core theme is "ontological dissatisfaction". The accent, she argues, falls on a genius' inability to "elevate" a world that only he understands to be flawed. Constantinescu suggests an intermediary position, discussing the daimon's "taming", his evolution towards a platonic love "that surpasses everything erotic in Eminescu's poetry".

Beyond the "celestial allegory", Perpessicius notes, Luceafărul is also a love poem, "one of the most natural, most authentic, most universal." Ștefănescu reads Luceafărul as a star-crossed fable and "eerie love-story", rating it above Romeo and Juliet. The implications of this have created enduring polemics between exegetes, an early example being one opposing Caracostea to George Călinescu. The latter, following other Freudian literati, commented that Eminescu was essentially obsessed with the idea of love, with Luceafărul displaying his casual objectification of women. The same point is made by Culianu, who notes that Eminescu identified love itself with a damsel in distress situation and voyeurism, both of which, he argues, exist in the "erotic scenario" called Luceafărul. Contrarily, Caracostea insisted that Eminescu's erotic passion was subsumed to a "quest for the absolute", manifested "in all other aspects of [his] poetic being".

Clues of Eminescu's views on love are contrasted by the element of physical desire, that of a young girl expecting her suitors—"the surge within a human being of a longing that she can only half-comprehend." This "puberal crisis" and "mysterious invasion of longing" had also appeared in Heliade Rădulescu's piece. Such precedents suggest that Cătălina is a feeble, ingénue, victim of her instincts. According to Geo Vasile: "she recognizes her own biological fate and accepts being courted by her mortal neighbor [...]. The maiden who happened to catch Hyperion's affection stands for the narrow fold, the human, historical, ontological conspiracy, downright puny when confronted with the nocturnal body's destiny". Author Ilie Constantin notes that Cătălin was a natural suitor, who "expunges Hyperion from Cătălina's attention, so that he and she may embark on their own union". In contrast to such readings, Vanhese sees the Princess as a playful destroyer, in the vein of La Belle Dame sans Merci and Salome.

=== Biographical record ===
Real-life inspirations for Luceafărul, according to Ioan Alexandru Brătescu-Voinești
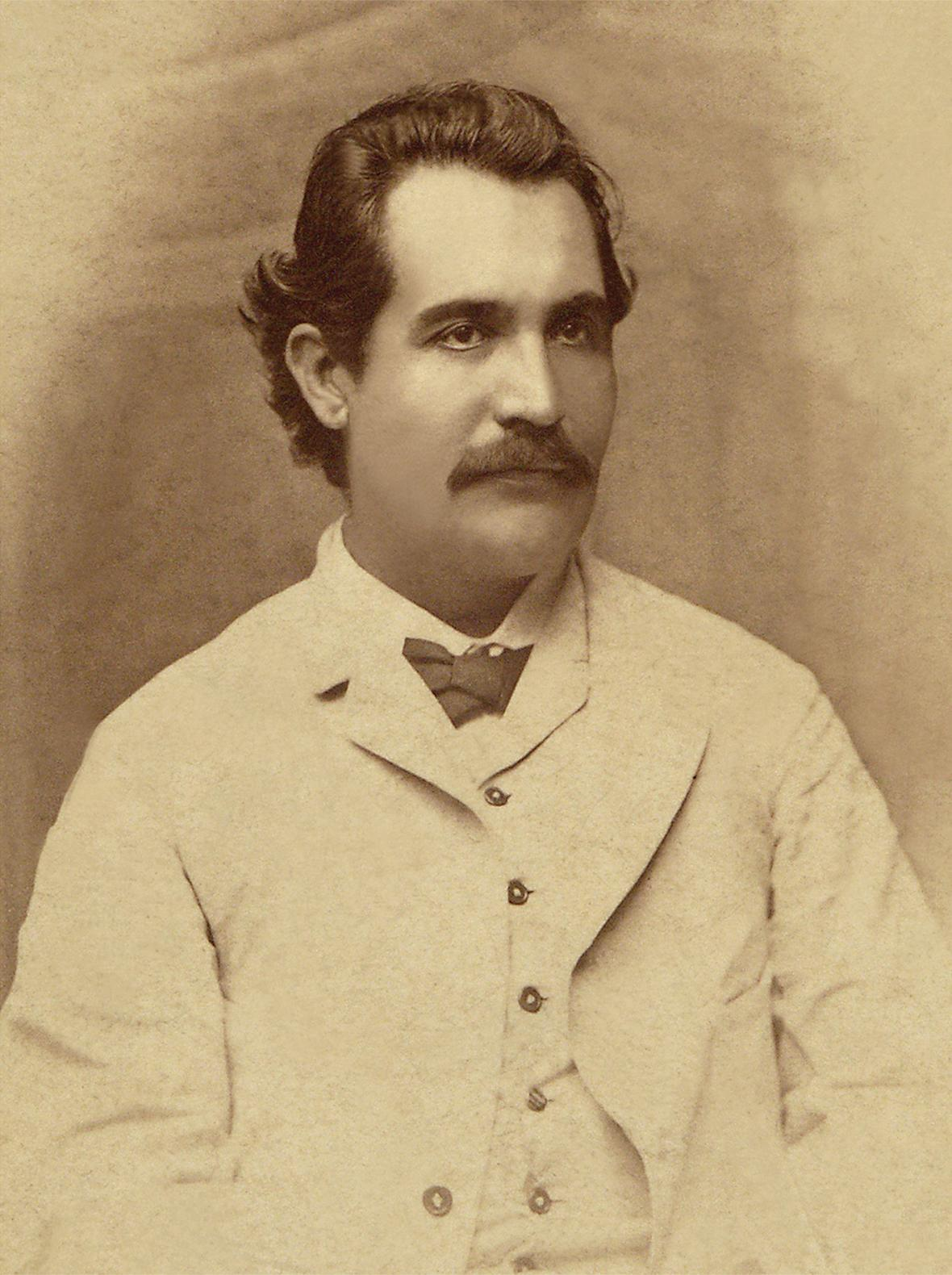
Eminescu (1884), or Hyperion

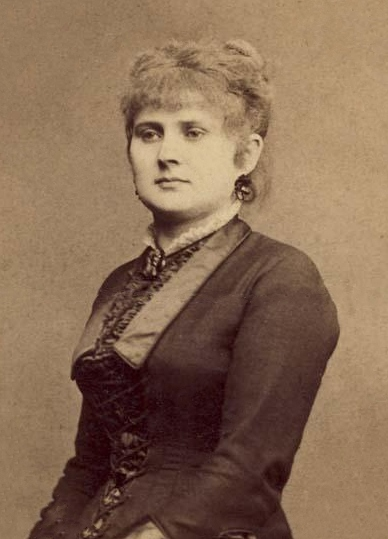
Veronica Micle, or Cătălina

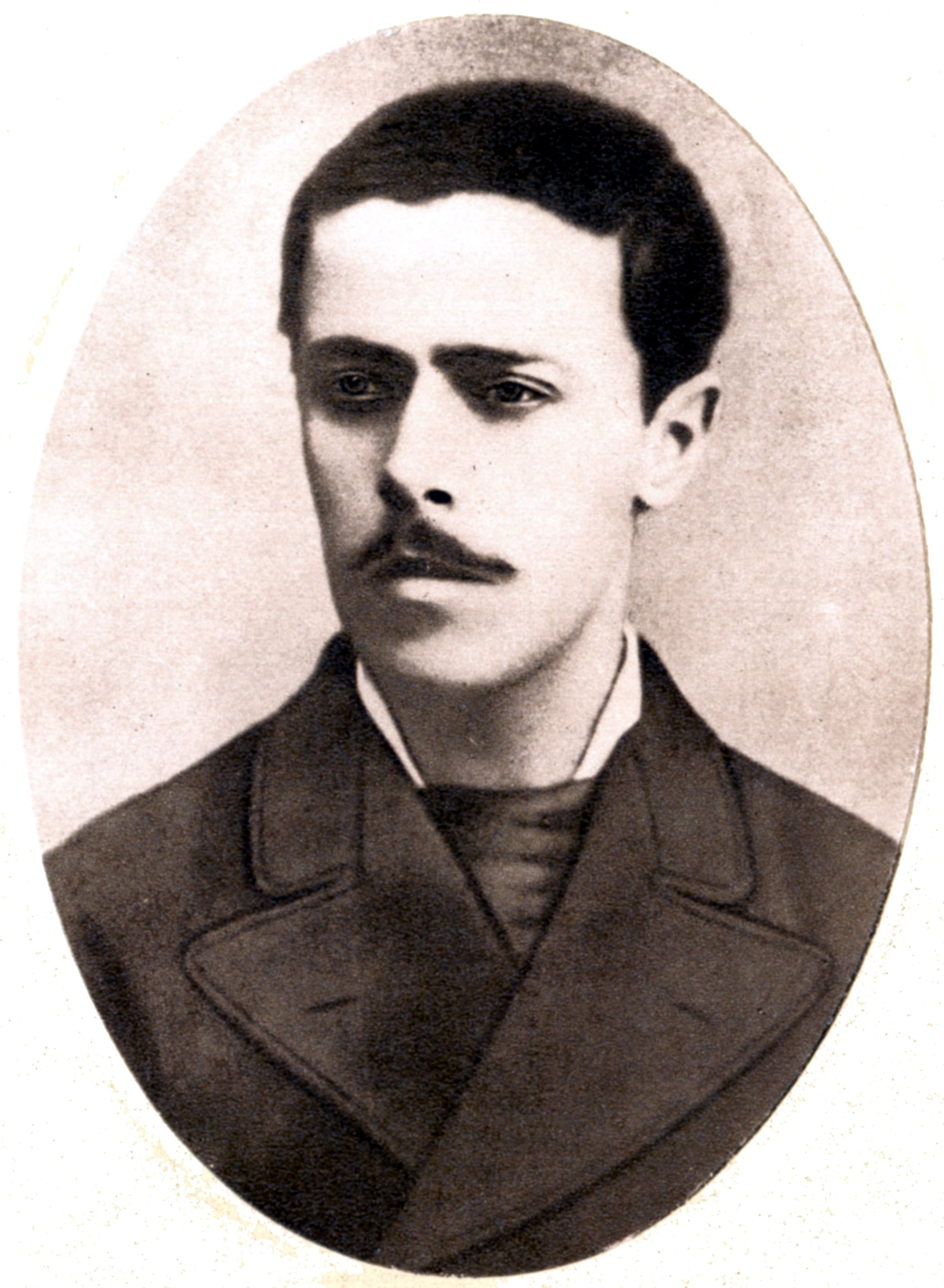
Ion Luca Caragiale (1879), or Cătălin

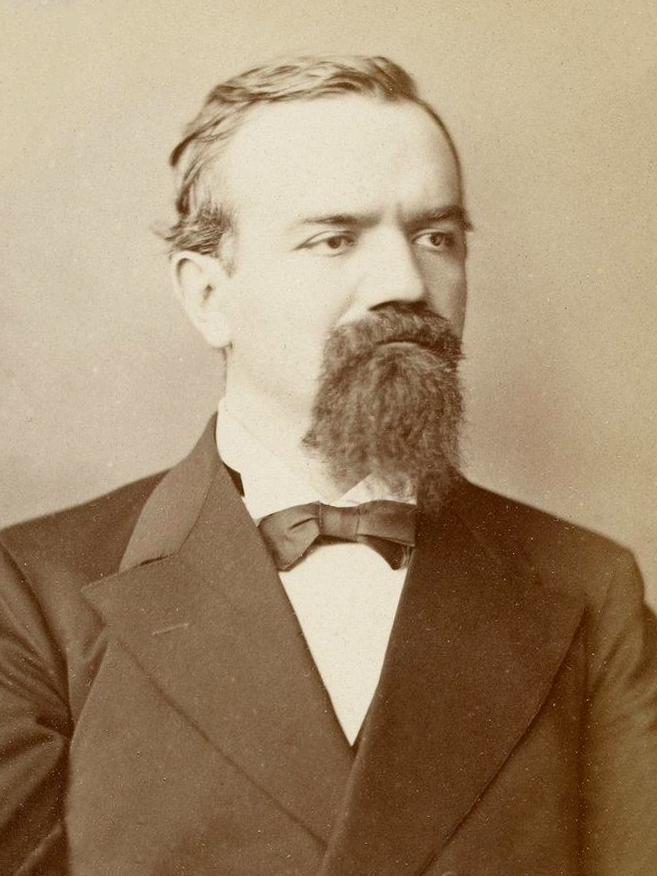
Titu Maiorescu (1882), or the Demiurge

Reviewing the placated tone implicit in the poem, Constantinescu proposes that Luceafărul "condenses not just one experience, but a whole sum of experiences, of sentimental failures." According to a story transmitted by the Junimist Ioan Alexandru Brătescu-Voinești, who claimed to have heard it from Maiorescu, Eminescu poured into the poem his bitterness towards an unfaithful lover, Veronica Micle. In this version of events, Micle is Cătălina and the page Cătălin is Eminescu's one-time friend and colleague, Ion Luca Caragiale; Maiorescu is the Demiurge.

Perpessicius dismisses the account as vorbe de clacă ("balderdash"), but notes that it was to some extent "natural" that rumors would emerge. Brătescu-Voinești was partly backed by another source, Eminescu aficionado Alexandru Vlahuță, who reported his friend's "one-time fling, a curious episode, which inspired him to write the poem Luceafărul and which I cannot render here." According to Caracostea, this testimony can be discounted, as Vlahuță also hints that Eminescu was delusional.

Researcher Șerban Cioculescu discovered that one aspect of the story was verifiable, namely that Caragiale had had a sexual escapade with Micle before February 1882. Eminescu knew and was angered about it, canceling his offer of marriage. However, Caracostea claims, the inspiration for the poem may have been Eminescu's other love interest, Cleopatra Lecca-Poenaru. On one of his notebooks, where he tries out various versions of Hyperion's travels to the cosmic edge, Eminescu interrupts himself with a diatribe, addressed to the "lousy coquette, Cleopatra." Caracostea also argues that the Caragiale–Micle affair, while confirmed, cannot have been mirrored in the poem, as the most relevant passages were written long before 1882.

== Legacy ==
=== Cultural symbol ===
==== Emergence ====
Luceafărul homages
Veronica Micle's own poetry volume (1887)

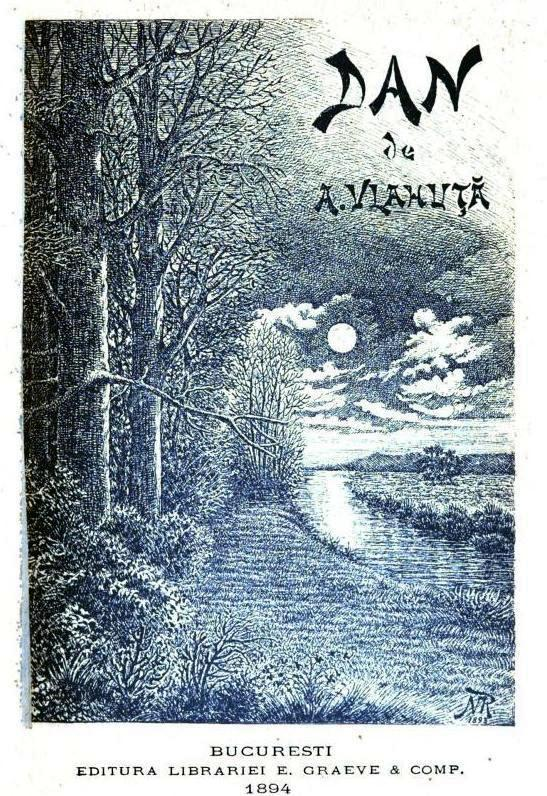
Cover of Alexandru Vlahuță's Dan (1894)

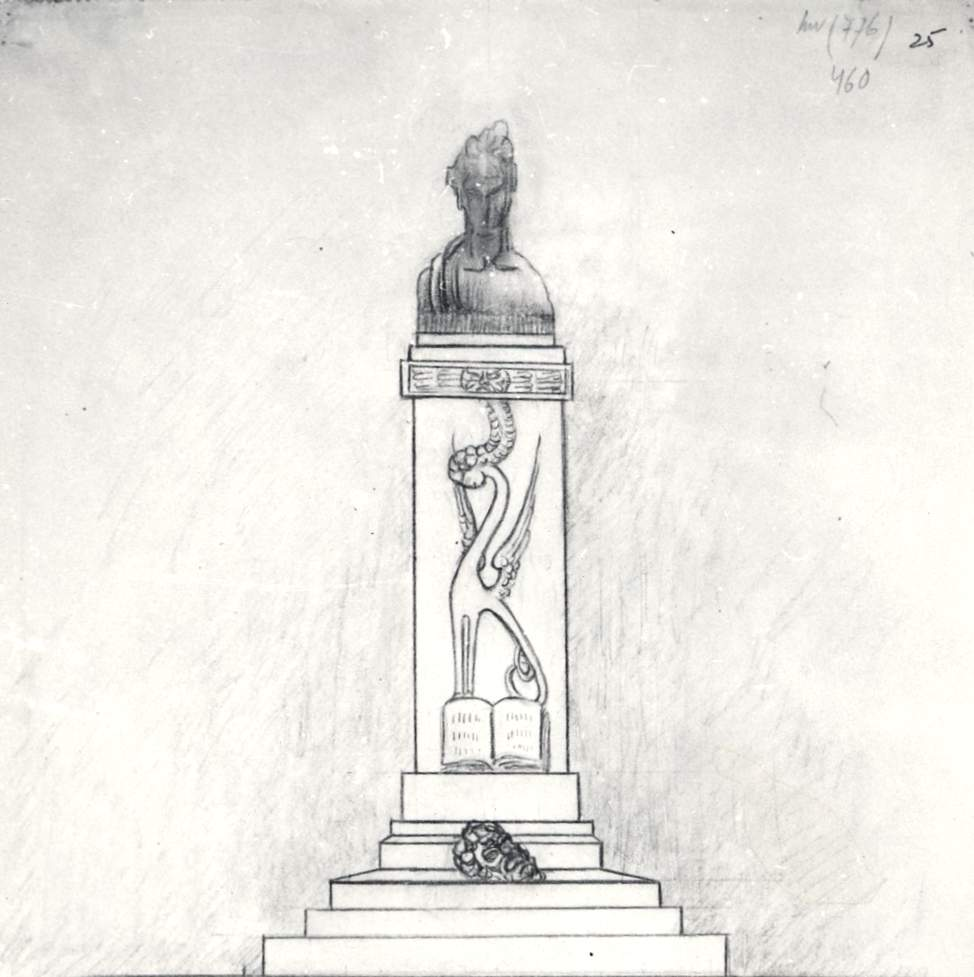
Dimitrie Paciurea's sketch for a monument to Eminescu, with a Sky Chimera (1920)

Writing in the 1940s, Caracostea pleaded for the poem to be "re-invoked" and kept alive, its themes and hidden meanings explained to successive generations. A while after, Constantinescu was to note that, "a Romantic in his work and in his life, Eminescu never had a chance to enjoy, after his death, a destiny like the Morning Star, with whom he identified, and if his glow was indeed 'deathless', it never was 'cold'." This popular enthusiasm for the poem has been criticized by some scholars, who noted its negative implications. According to Eugen Negrici, the "Eminescu myth" is a resilient element of literary culture, leading from a poète maudit trope to the "aggressive tabooing and delirium about genius." As he notes, Luceafărul was especially important as autofiction, encouraging "analogical reasoning" among its readers: "the text has produced exhilaration in academia and has stirred affection for the poet, a distortion sparked by the mystique of writings which bear the mark of destiny". Culianu also refers to the "absurdities" and "bewildering speculations" allowed by critical tradition, a "Tower of Babel erected for worshiping Luceafărul."

During Eminescu's withdrawal from public life, the poem slowly garnered its cult following. In 1887 already, the pedagogue Gh. Gh. Arbore was introducing the poem as one of the most significant ever written in Romanian. Some of its most enthusiastic promoters in the 1890s were young socialists, who, though opposed to Junimist politics, were won over by Eminescu's poetic style, and by samples of his social critique—especially the poem "Emperor and Proletarian". At a congress in September 1890, Constantin Vasiliu acknowledged that there was a clash of visions between the two poetic texts, both by Eminescu; however, he offered the conclusion that Eminescu was complex enough for producing both a "philosophy of annihilation" and a socialist-like attack on the "corrupt society that had engulfed him." Literary historian Savin Bratu suggests that the first decade of Eminescu's posterity was marked by a clash of vision as to who Eminescu actually was. The Maiorescu disciples looked to Luceafărul and Glossa, whereas "socialist students" found themselves in "Emperor and Proletarian". As noted by Caracostea, two anti-Junimist authors, Aron Densușianu and Alexandru Grama, resisted the poem's growing popularity, producing conjectural "words of scorn". The former claimed in 1896 that Eminescu's poetry was "generally libidinous, poorly conceptualized", with Luceafărul as "drivel of that most hysterical kind".

Caracostea's own embrace of the poem showed its influence on the emergent (and otherwise anti-Junimist) symbolist movement. The first author to draw inspiration from Luceafărul was Micle. The alleged Cătălina reused the themes in poems she completed after Eminescu's illness and death. She was closely followed by Eminescu's disciple Vlahuță, whose 1894 novel, Dan, "transposes the conflict highlighted in Luceafărul." In 1902, the Romanians in Hungary established a literary magazine of the same name, in what was a conscious nod to Eminescu's poem. Four years later, the poem had entered the Romania's national curriculum with a 7th-grade textbook by Petre V. Haneș. During this interval, Luceafărul and other Eminescian writings became the inspiration for hugely popular postcards illustrated by Leonard Salmen. A bibliophile edition with 22 artworks by Mișu Teișanu came out at the eponymous Luceafărul Society in 1921–1923.

By then, Symbolist Dimitrie Paciurea had begun work on several works directly referencing Hyperion, including sketches for an Eminescu monument, leading up to his Sky Chimera; Nicolae Bretan had adapted the poem into an eponymous opera, which he himself translated into Hungarian. Sculptor Ion Schmidt-Faur also paid homage (to the poem rather than its protagonist) in his 1929 relief of Cătălin and Cătălina, installed at the base of his Eminescu statue in Iași. During the interwar, the identification of poet and protagonist was also taken up by Lovinescu in his work as a biographical novelist: he intended to write a romanticized account, also titled Luceafărul, dealing mainly with the hero's childhood in Ipotești. Mircea Eliade rendered ample homage to Luceafărul, in his novel Miss Christina, but especially so in his short story Șarpele ("The Serpent"), which relies on intertextual allusion to the point of becoming its "hierophany". Andronic the aviator, a central character in the latter narrative, is a modern-day Morning Star, replicating "the fall".

==== Communist peak and aftermath ====
Arms of Botoșani County during the communist period. The five-pointed star is a symbolic reference to Eminescu

The Morning Star reference peaked in usage under the communist regime. With the advent of Socialist Realism, Eminescu's political works were ignored, but Luceafărul remained in the textbooks, with commentary by Perpessicius and Alexandru Rosetti. In 1959, Marietta Sadova penned a stage adaptation, taken up by the National Theater Bucharest; Emil Botta and Mimi Botta were its two protagonists. Mythical recovery was particularly strong during the final stages of national communism, when, Negrici argues, Eminescu was publicly celebrated with "grotesque displays". Both "Morning Star" and "Demiurge" were informal titles used in the personality cult of President Nicolae Ceaușescu. The new arms of Botoșani County, approved in 1972, featured an allegorical and canting representation of Eminescu as a five-pointed star. In 1988, the Romanian Communist Party fabricated an Eminescu Pond in Ipotești, complete with neon lighting in the shape of a Morning Star. During that period, Sabin Bălașa contributed a fresco of Hyperion for the halls of Alexandru Ioan Cuza University. Young Romanian poets also took interest in the myth, with Ana Blandiana penning Octombrie, noiembrie, decembrie ("October, November, December"), which is in part a feminized version of Luceafărul.

Although interest in the poem was preserved after the 1989 Revolution, it was largely confined to the private sphere. Ștefănescu stated that, by 2015, Hyperion was more famous than his creator, as Hamlet is to William Shakespeare. He also observed that the once-popular metonymy "Morning Star of Romanian poetry" (for Eminescu) had faded out of use, as "wooden tongue [...] relegated to official speeches." As a title, Luceafărul remained in use by trade unionists involved in the violent Mineriads of the 1990s, applied to their leader Miron Cozma. In his final book, published in 2000, philosopher Laurențiu Ulici argued that Hyperion had become recognized as one incarnation of the national psychology, in an oxymoronic blend: the other component was Caragiale's creation, the easy-going, cynical and prosaic Mitică.

Hyperion remained important as a cultural symbol within the Romanian diaspora, which had published its first edition. In the late 1940s, Eliade and Virgil Ierunca founded their own Luceafărul as an anti-communist journal in Paris. Another exile, Paul Celan, reportedly introduced his Austrian friend Ingeborg Bachmann to Eminescu's poem—its core themes were discovered by critics in Bachmann's novel Malina (1971). In the Moldavian SSR, where Eminescu was being reclaimed for Moldovan literature, references to the message of Luceafărul were toned down due to Soviet censorship. In 1954, Vasile Coroban introduced it is a "political poem"; the following year, it was only allowed 25 pages in the Eminescu monograph put out by Constantin Popovici, which awarded 70 pages to the "revolutionary" verse in "Emperor and Proletarian". The poem still had a cult readership among the Romanians of that area, where, in 1974, Gheorghe Vrabie contributed a set of illustrations in aquatint and eau-forte. The Soviet republic also hosted a Luceafărul Theater and produced a feature film of the same name, directed by Emil Loteanu. Starring Vasile Zubcu-Codreanu in the title role, it is the only Eminescu biopic. In 1983, the poem also inspired Loteanu to write the script for a ballet, with music by Eugen Doga. Alexa Ispas, a Romanian expatriate in Scotland, adapted the poem into a theatrical play, performed in English at Govanhill Baths (2014).

=== Published translations ===
Luceafărul's first-ever translation was in January 1883, when Maiorescu's friend Mite Kremnitz rendered the draft poem into German, with a new version produced ten years later by Edgar von Herz. Several others followed in that language, including Immanuel Weissglas' (1937), Olvian Soroceanu's (1940), Zoltán Franyó's (1943), and Günther Deicke's (1964). Nicolae Sulică self-published a fragmentary Latin version, titled Hesperus, for his 1920s magazine Incitamentum. A Spanish version was completed by Rafael Alberti, and published at Buenos Aires in 1958—it was seen from the Romanian side as laudable, but imperfect. In the 1950s and '60s, Franyó and then Sándor Kacsó translated the entity of Eminescu's poetic work into Hungarian, while Vilém Závada produced his Czech version of Luceafărul. Carlo Tagliavini rendered fragments of the poem into Italian, with commentary, in 1923, while numerous translations were attempted in French, for instance that of Ion Ureche (1939). A Greek version, done by Rita Boumi-Pappa, appeared in a 1964 edition of Eminescu verse; the Bulgarian Eminescu corpus, translated by various local poets and appearing in 1973, included a Luceafărul-themed drawing by Ivan Kosev. In Russian, David Samoylov has penned a version of Luceafărul that reportedly stays very close to the Romanian original.

Leon Levițchi's corpus of English translations from Eminescu first appeared in 1978, one year after the death of another celebrated Eminescu translator, the teenaged Corneliu M. Popescu. In 1984, Cartea Românească put out a volume featuring Deicke and Popescu's versions, and renditions into seven other languages: French, by Mihail Bantaș; Spanish, by Omar Lara; Armenian, by H. Dj. Siruni; Russian, by Yuriy Kozhevnikov and I. Mirinski; Italian, by Mario De Micheli; Hungarian, by Jenő Kiss; and Portuguese, by Dan Caragea. New Italian renditions were also done by Marco Cugno (1989–1990) and Geo Vasile (2000). There are also several versions of the poem in Serbo-Croatian, including one by Mate Maras (1998). Another English version, the work of Josef Johann Soltesz, was printed in 2004, followed by Tomy Sigler's Hebrew (2008) and Todur Zanet's Gagauz (2013), then by Miroslava Metleaeva's new Russian and Güner Akmolla's Crimean Tatar (both 2015). The project of translating into French was again taken up in the 2010s, with Jean-Louis Courriol authoring a celebrated adaptation. Courriol has nevertheless avoided including it in French anthologies, arguing that Luceafărul was no longer relevant or understandable.
