= Alexandru Toma =

Romanian poet, journalist and translator (1875–1954)

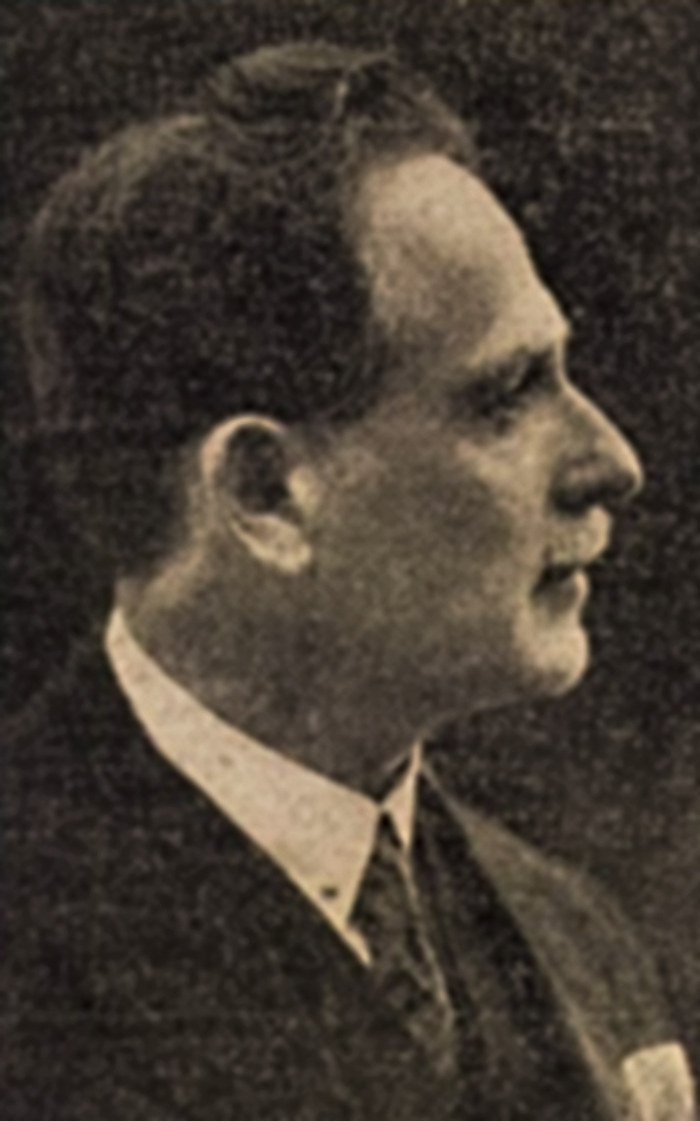
- Toma, photographed before 1935
- Born: Solomon Moscovici; February 11, 1875; Urziceni, Romania
- Died: August 15, 1954 (aged 79); Bucharest
- Occupations: poet, journalist, translator, publisher, political activist
- Writing career
- Pen name: Endymon, Falstaff, Hâncu, St. Tomșa
- Period: 1890-1954
- Genres: children's rhyme, lyric poetry, satire, doina
- Literary movement: Symbolism, Viața Românească, Socialist Realism

Alexandru Toma (occasionally known as A. Toma, born Solomon Moscovici; February 11, 1875 – August 15, 1954) was a Romanian poet, journalist and translator, known for his communist views and his role in introducing Socialist Realism to Romanian literature. Having debuted as a Symbolist, Toma was influenced by 19th-century writer Mihai Eminescu, an admiration which came to characterize his entire work. The official poet during the early years of the Communist regime and appointed a full member of the Romanian Academy, he is considered by many commentators to have actually been a second-shelf writer, with a problematic legacy.

Toma was, alongside novelist Mihail Sadoveanu, one of the literary figures whose writings were associated with the early years of Communism in Romania. Officials equated him with Eminescu, whose lyrical poems he would often adapt to the Socialist Realist guidelines, replacing their pessimism with an officially endorsed uplifting message. His other writings included positive portrayals of Stakhanovite workers, praises of Soviet leader Joseph Stalin, as well as poems for children. Supported by the regime and widely publicized until shortly before his death, he fell out of favor and his work was gradually marginalized during the final years of Gheorghe Gheorghiu-Dej's rule.

He was the father of Sorin Toma, a Romanian Communist Party activist and journalist himself noted for his commitment to Socialist Realism, as well as for his officially endorsed attacks on the influential poet Tudor Arghezi. Alexandru Toma's nephew, Virgiliu Moscovici-Monda, was himself a Symbolist poet.

== Biography ==
=== Early life and career ===
The future Alexandru Toma was born into a Jewish family in Urziceni, where his father Leibu Moscovici worked as a grocer. Leibu's other son, Zeilic, fathered Virgiliu Moscovici, who also pursued a career in literature during the interwar period, publishing several of his works under the pen name Virgiliu Monda.

Toma completed his secondary education in the industrial city of Ploiești, after which he graduated in Letters and Philosophy from the University of Bucharest. He qualified as a history and philosophy teacher, and was employed as such by several schools in Bucharest, including Basarab and Saint Sava colleges. His poetic work, and his first translations from foreign authors, were published by Lumea Ilustrată magazine. He was using the pen name Endymon. This period saw his alignment with the Marxist movement: after writing for Munca daily, he became involved with the socialist tribune, Lumea Nouă, where he published rhyming satires under the pseudonyms of Hâncu and Falstaff. He became known to the socialist public as St. Tomșa, and, using this signature, published translations from Adelbert von Chamisso, Heinrich Heine, Nikolaus Lenau, Sándor Petőfi etc.

Toma was mostly active in the press of Moldavia region, writing for left-wing newspapers such as Evenimentul. He was notably present (in 1897) on the writing staff of Noutatea, published in Iași by Avram Steuerman-Rodion and various others. Toma was progressively involved with the far left circles and the Romanian Kingdom's labor movement. However, in 1897, he is known to have authored a Romanian-language translation of poems by Elisabeth of Wied, the wife of King Carol I—this detail was later expunged from his official biographies. In his own recollections, Toma admitted having met the Queen-consort and, in her entourage, the celebrated dramatist Ion Luca Caragiale.

Toma's literary debut was associated with Symbolism, and critics traditionally include him among the "proletarian" wing of the Romanian Symbolist movement. In 1902, he began corresponding with Symbolist poet Elena Farago, whose career he closely followed; Moscovici-Monda also adopted Symbolism, representing its late stages in local literature. By the early 1910s, Toma had also been published by the prestigious Iași review, Viața Românească. By 1912, he was exploring Romanian nationalist themes, deploring the fate of Romanians in the Bessarabia Governorate in a doina "for our lost brothers".

Shortly after World War I, Toma returned with a translation from Molière's Tartuffe, published in 1918, and staged by the National Theatre Bucharest a year later. In 1925, Viața Românească released his brochure Zi de vară până'n seară ("One Full Summer's Day"). Toma's first edition of collected works, bearing the title Poezii ("Poems"), was published by Editura Cultura Națională in 1926. The volume was paid for by Toma's friends and collaborators, but received much critical interest, and was positively reviewed by modernist theorist Eugen Lovinescu in his History of Contemporary Romanian Literature. It earned Toma the Romanian Academy's Ion Heliade Rădulescu Award.

Toma was in demand as a translator. He authored versions of: La Renaissance, by Count Gobineau (Ancona, 1925); Leo Tolstoy's stories for children (Editura Adevĕrul, 1930); Hugo Bettauer's Joyless Street (Hertz, 1931); Heinrich Lhotzky's pedology (Adevĕrul, 1932); and Kurt Münzer's I'm Hungry (Adevĕrul, 1932). The poet also worked as editor of the children's magazines Steaua Copiilor and Amicul Copiilor, before launching the literary review Lectura.

At that stage in his life, Toma had joined the communist underground. As his wife Sidy later recounted to Communist Party officials, both she and her husband helped hide Party members in their home during the interwar period, when the movement had been outlawed. She also noted that it was Alexandru Toma who introduced his son Sorin to Marxism. The latter also became an activist of the Communist Party, taking refuge in the Soviet Union during World War II, fighting as a partisan after the start Operation Barbarossa, returning to Romania with the Red Army (see Soviet occupation of Romania), and later working as editor in chief of the Communist newspaper Scînteia. In Romania, the fascist and antisemitic National Legionary government expelled Toma from the Romanian Writers' Society (SSR), together with all other Jewish members (October 1940). Later, the Ion Antonescu dictatorship included both Alexandru Toma and Moscovici-Monda on a nationally circulated list of banned Jewish authors.

=== Official endorsement ===
Alexandru Toma's moment of preeminence occurred by the time he was in his seventies, when the newly established Communist regime came to promote him as a paramount representative of Proletkult literature and as the greatest Romanian poet alive. He was readmitted into the reformed SSR during September 1947, shortly after an inner purge of writers perceived as fascist. Writing in 1948, Romania's official Marxist-Leninist ideologue and Agitprop supervisor Leonte Răutu casually referred to Toma as "the poet most connected to the [communist] party", while criticizing his own subordinate, Nicolae Moraru, for having failed to acknowledge the fact. This review coincided with a cultural campaign partly replicating the Soviet Zhdanov Doctrine, during which Romanian culture was purged of influences deemed reactionary (see Socialist realism in Romania). Thus, Toma's works were for the first time introduced in the school textbooks, where, alongside those by Communist short story writer Alexandru Sahia and the left-leaning novelist Sadoveanu, they stood as the sole samples of 20th-century Romanian literature. The three figures were also among the few interwar authors to be frequented by official works of criticism. Both he and Sadoveanu, together presiding over the 1949 establishment of a politicized Writers' Union, were paid homage with special festivities, which, according to literary critic Florin Mihăilescu, evidenced a personality cult equivalent only to those of Joseph Stalin and local Party leader Gheorghe Gheorghiu-Dej. The regime also awarded Toma its State Prize First Class for Poetry.

Virtually all of Toma's literary contributions were published in one volume, titled Cîntul vieții ("The Song of Life") and prefaced by the Communist essayist Ion Vitner, which went through three editions between 1950 and 1954. According to literary historian Ion Simuț, the 1951 print reached 15,000 copies, which was exceptional for its time. Also unusually for the period, the book was also circulated abroad, in state-sponsored translations (Hungarian in 1955 and 1955, German and Russian in 1956; an English-language translation saw print in 1951). In addition to Cîntul vieții, some of Toma's poetry was collected in Poezii alese ("Selected Poems"), published in 1952 and 1953. The original edition featured a preface by Sergiu Fărcășan, and was printed in 10,150 copies, while the second one, issued for schoolchildren by the specialized publisher Editura Tineretului, reached 30,000 copies. His works for children were featured in various separate editions. Toma also republished his Tartuffe, and contributed to a 1956 anthology of poems translated from the work of Heinrich Heine.

A peak in Alexandru Toma's career occurred on February 14, 1950, when the Romanian Academy celebrated his 75th birthday (with a three-day delay). The occasion was marked by the speeches of Academy President Traian Săvulescu, literary historian George Călinescu, and Mihai Beniuc, and culminated with the poet's own address. Toma, who displayed a dose of self-criticism over various moments of weakness in his career, underlined his own role in "the careful, masterful, cultivation of a renewed, simple, clear form, well-suited to Socialist Realism and Revolutionary Romanticism." The last words of his speech were comments on Stalin and the Soviet claim to stand against nuclear armament: "Only the titan-like hands of Iosif Vissarionovich Stalin, as a trustee of his people and of the entire human race, can stop the monstrous atom bomb in flight, can envelop it, can suffocate it, can extinguish it."

=== Final years ===
More homages to Alexandru Toma accumulated during his later years. In 1951, his portrait was painted by the celebrated Jean Alexandru Steriadi, and described by critics as one of Steriadi's best works. In 1952, some of Toma's poems were published in the volume Poezie nouă în R.P.R. ("New Poetry in the P[eople's] R[epublic of] R[omania]"), together with those of Anatol E. Baconsky, Maria Banuș, Dan Deșliu, Mihu Dragomir, Eugen Frunză, Ștefan Iureș, Eugen Jebeleanu, Veronica Porumbacu and twenty-four others.

In the 7th grade textbook of 1953, local literature was represented by twelve writers: alongside the writers considered classics before and since (Eminescu, Ion Luca Caragiale, Alexandru Vlahuță, Grigore Alexandrescu, George Coșbuc, Vasile Alecsandri, Ion Creangă, Nicolae Bălcescu and Sadoveanu himself), Toma, Sahia and Dumitru Theodor Neculuță were selected for their political convictions. Toma was not allocated as much space as Eminescu and Sadoveanu, but his entry matched those on Caragiale and Alecsandri. The textbook ended with an anthology of newer literary works by authors in favor with the regime—alongside poet Mihai Beniuc, these included Banuș, Deșliu, Jebeleanu, Porumbacu, Aurel Baranga, Mihail Davidoglu, Petru Dumitriu, as well as a few others—and a similar overview of Soviet literature. It was at this stage that, in his University of Bucharest lectures, Vitner came to refer to Toma as a "national poet", placing him alongside Neculuță, Sahia and the early 20th century socialist Constantin Mille. Vitner declared this to be Romania's only non-"reactionary" line of prewar writers.

In spring 1953, after Stalin's death was made known to the world, Toma was one of the tens of prominent Romanian authors who contributed articles in his memory; his piece, titled Viață dați stalinistului gînd! ("Bring the Stalinist Thought to Reality!"), was published by Viața Românească. Official endorsement of Toma's work continued in 1953–1954, when the Romanian regime reacted against the first generation of Socialist realists by imposing the cultural doctrines of Georgy Malenkov.

Late in life, Toma headed Editura de stat pentru literatură și artă, an official publishing house tasked with enforcing the main editorial policies, and, according to philologist and memoirist Gheorghe Pienescu, was "its last (or so I thought) dogmatic Stalinist director." One of the last campaigns which made use of his poems was the 1953 World Festival of Youth and Students, hosted in Bucharest. Toma died in Bucharest the following year, his body cremated at Cenușa Society.

== Poetry ==
=== Conceptual Symbolism ===
During his time as a Symbolist, Toma was part of a "proletarian" generation active within the movement. It also included George Bacovia, Traian Demetrescu, Mihail Cruceanu and Andrei Naum, contrasting to both the Parnassian school of Alexandru Macedonski and the balladesque style associated with Ștefan Octavian Iosif. This period was also marked by echoes from the works of traditionalist poets. Eugen Lovinescu proposed that, while being the "direct inheritor" of Eminescu's creation, and placed under his "overwhelming influence", Toma's Poezii also showed his admiration for Coșbuc, Vlahuță, Panait Cerna, Corneliu Moldovanu and D. Nanu.

The result was "a 'conceptual' poetry, that is to say a rationalist poetry, one of problems solved through dramatic means, through moral means, through psychological means [...] or even through sheer anecdote [...]." A socialist ideal was encapsulated in this poetic thesis. Himself a socialist, writer Gala Galaction lauded "brother Toma" for having managed to keep alive the militancy "of the great generation, 1880 to 1900." According to another contemporary voice, that of essayist Constantin Șăineanu, Toma was in fact outlining a slightly pessimistic worldview. As depicted by Toma, mankind was wasting its energies in the vain search for salvation and beauty. Still, Toma did not see human suffering as an inescapable reality, but wrote:

Destul cu harfele de jale, —
De desnădejde, ori de ură —
Voi nu știți crezul ce vestește
Izbândă razei de căldură...

Translation:

Enough of grieving harps,
Of disarray, of hatred.
You cannot yet see the belief, the promise,
Of victory in rays of heat...

Noting the similarities between Toma's concepts and the ideas voiced, in the same generation, by poet Haralamb Lecca, Lovinescu argued that Poezii evidenced "a great and honest professional consciousness, an inspiration of intellectual quality, laid out in impeccable volutes". However, he also criticized the volume for lacking "the element of innovation in sensitivity and expression."

In more traditional circles, Toma was received with reserve. As one of Toma's first traditionalist reviewers, Ilarie Chendi noted being unimpressed by Toma's "cold and philosophical poetry". Theorist Mihail Dragomirescu, a rival of Lovinescu's, recognized in Toma an "interesting poet", with a good grasp of his second language, but concluded that his was generally not "great poetry".

=== Communist verse ===
Early in the 1950s, Toma was especially known for poems illustrating the communist regime's ideological priorities. According to Ion Simuț, Cîntul vieții, whose title alluded to "the necessity of optimistically singing hymns to life and completely ignoring the theme of death", was a repository for "opportunistic literature" and "all sorts of clichés." One writing in this series, the 1950 Silvester Andrei salvează abatajul ("Silvester Andrei Rescues the Coal Face"), depicted Stakhanovite socialist emulation and heroic self-sacrifice, while alluding to inter-ethnic brotherhood among mine workers. Part of it read:

Așa sfătuiau, buni fârtați între ei,
Bogănici Neculai și Silvester Andrei,
Miner și vagonetar - puși pe listă,
Fruntași în întrecerea socialistă.

Translation:

This is how they advised each other, as good brothers,
Bogănici Neculai and Silvester Andrei,
Miner and trammer—both listed,
Front-runners in the socialist race.

Some of his works dealt with moments that the Communist regime considered emblematic, such as the October Revolution, the Grivița Strike of 1933, and World War II Soviet entry into Romania. Other poems of the same year celebrated the "fight for peace" endorsed by official Eastern Bloc propaganda after the start of the Cold War, condemning nuclear armament while depicting Joseph Stalin in eulogistic terms:

E-o luptă de soi nou în lume
Și-avem stegar să ne îndrume
Cu braț de-oțel și fruntea soare
Pe Stalin sfetnic de popoare.
Pieri-veți fauri de război
Sub potopirea vieții noi
Și-n slujba noastră stă atomul
Dar ca să-nalțe viața, omul.

Translation:

There is a new brand of struggle in the world
And for a standard bearer to lead us
With an arm of steel and forehead the sun
We have Stalin as counsel of peoples.
You shall be gone, instigators of war
Under the flood of a new life
And we have the atom to serve us
But so that it can uplift life, mankind.

Some of Toma's poetic texts in Cîntul vieții was primarily dedicated to illustrations of how Communist Party indications, such as the fight against art for art's sake, were to be applied in practice. Such pieces satirized poetry perceived as antiquated: "individualist", "aestheticist", "surrealist", "obscurantist", "hermeticist" and "escapist". One stanza, judged by Ion Simuț to display "involuntary humor", was written from the perspective on one such condemned author:

Eu astralul cântăreț
Îngheț!
Cad din lună.
Nu-i a bună.
"Arta pură" nu mai are preț.

Translation:

I the stellar singer
Am freezing!
I fall down from the Moon.
Stuff's not right.
"Pure art" is no longer in demand.

As a children's rhyme author, Alexandru Toma notably contributed the poem Cîntecul bradului ("The Song of the Fir Tree"), a reference to the Christmas tree—a symbol and custom condoned despite Christmas being frowned upon by the Communist authorities. It read:

Brăduleț, brăduț drăguț
Ninge peste tine
Haide, vino-n casa mea
Unde-i cald și bine.

Translation:

Littlest fir tree, nice little fir tree
It snows upon you
Come, enter my house
Where it is all nice and warm.

=== Borrowings from Eminescu ===
One of Alexandru Toma's most recognizable themes was his re-creation of poems by Mihai Eminescu. Eminescu was a conservative and Neoclassicist, whose style was often somber and occasionally pessimistic—this, alongside the poet's nationalist stance, and despite official acceptance, was in sharp contrast to the ideological tenets. Eminescu's work was therefore not made available to the public in its entirety, while some of the Romantic poems of his youth were presented as evidence that he was actually progressive and a believer in class struggle.

One of Eminescu's most famous poems, Glossă, dominated by skepticism and recommending aloofness, opened with the lyrics:

Vreme trece, vreme vine,
Toate-s vechi și nouă toate;
Ce e rău și ce e bine
Tu te-ntreabă și socoate;
Nu spera și nu ai teamă,
Ce e val ca valul trece;
De te-ndeamnă, de te cheamă,
Tu rămâi la toate rece.

Translation:

Time goes by, time comes along,
All are old and new are all;
All things wrong and all things right
Ask yourself and consider;
Do not hope and have no fear,
What is wave, like wave shall pass;
If they urge you, if they call you,
You remain indifferent to all.

Toma, whom the regime often described as a new Eminescu, added a new perspective in his version:

Mergi spre vremea care vine,
Crezi în om: ce vrea, el poate;
Ce e rău, tu schimbă-n bine,
Faur vieții te socoate;
Speră, luptă fără teamă,
Fapta nu e val ce trece;
Frați de-ndeamnă, frați de cheamă
Cum poți sta-mpietrit și rece?

Translation:

Go down towards the coming age,
Believe in man: what he wants, he can;
What is wrong, change into right,
Consider yourself a creator of life;
Hope, fight fearlessly,
The deed is not a passing wave;
When brothers urge, when brothers call
How can you stand still and cold?

A similar thing was attempted by Toma in respect to one of Eminescu's other major poems, "Out of All the Masts". The original read:

Dintre sute de catarge
Care lasă malurile,
Câte oare le vor sparge
Vânturile, valurile?

Dintre pasări călătoare
Ce străbat pământurile,
Câte-o să le-nece oare
Valurile, vânturile?

Translation:

Out of the many hundreds of masts
Parting with the shoreline,
How many shall be broken
By the winds, by the sea?

Out of the migratory birds
That fly across the lands,
How many shall be drowned
By the waves, by the winds?

In Alexandru Toma's version, this was adapted to:

Câte sute de catarge
Dârze lasă malurile,
Mult sunt ce nu le-or sparge
Vânturile, valurile.

Duc belșug, solii de viață
Și străbat pământurile,
Ști-vor înfrunta prin ceață
Valurile, vânturile.

Translation:

Out of the many hundreds of masts
Courageously parting with the shoreline,
Many shall not be broken
By the winds, by the waves.

They carry wealth, errands of life
And reach across the lands,
Many shall know how to face through the fog
The waves, the winds.

== Legacy ==
=== Endorsement and decline ===
In a collection of studies investigating the official discourse of Communist Romania, historian Lucian Boia noted that Alexandru Toma's endorsement by the cultural authorities was specifically meant to fill the gap left by the purging of other, more talented, writers from the curriculum (see Censorship in Communist Romania). He suggests that this move was closely related to the claim that socialist society was naturally superior to the "bourgeois-landowning society", and further enhanced by several major cultural figures having refused to collaborate with the regime. Historian Vladimir Tismăneanu, who referred to Toma as "the official bard of the Stalinist epoch in Romania", described him as "a poet of meager talent but huge ambitions". He also credited him with having authored the lyrics to the first of Communist Romania's national anthems, Zdrobite cătușe.

Arguing that the Communist Party fabricated the "Toma myth" in order to provide a poet whose scale would match that of the prose writer Mihail Sadoveanu (himself noted for his close connection with the regime), Boia pointed that, in contrast, important poets such as Tudor Arghezi or Lucian Blaga, who refused collaboration, were originally left "completely outside the game". He also proposed that Toma's promotion was indicative of a will to replace "the natural order of things [italics in the original]", and "no less abhorrent" than other major Communist projects to reshape Romania—citing among these the restructuring of Romanian economy on the basis of Marxian guidelines (with the collateral attempt to turn Romania into a major producer of steel), the unsuccessful plan to reclaim the Danube Delta, and the completion of a massive House of the People during the 1980s. Also according to Lucian Boia, Toma's belonging to one of Romania's ethnic minorities was of further interest to the regime, at a time when proletarian internationalism was highlighted in official discourse: "the recourse to 'other nationalities' seemed to the new masters as an ideal method to crush the traditional cultural patterns."

Although Ion Vitner's study on Alexandru Toma served as a model for Mihail Novicov's monograph on Sadoveanu, the poet himself was fading out of official discourse by the moment of his death. He happened to die in August, at a time when the regime was preparing to celebrate the 10th anniversary of an event which it considered its founding moment, the King Michael Coup of 1944. It was largely as a result of this that his obituary was not featured on the front page of cultural magazines such as Contemporanul, and its text was both cut short and less complimentary than many previous articles. Around that time, the regime could count on the affiliation of younger and more prestigious poets, of whom Nicolae Labiș was the prime example, as well as eventually gaining the allegiance of Arghezi. A last edition of his works was published in 1959, as part of a collection for schoolchildren, after which his name was almost never invoked in officially endorsed literature. It was however assigned to a street in Bucharest and to a school in Ploiești.

Later, Alexandru Toma's position as a supporter of internationalism came to clash with the official discourse: nationalism was reintroduced by Gheorghe Gheorghiu-Dej, and especially by his successor Nicolae Ceaușescu. In 1984, under Ceaușescu's national communist leadership, literary critic Mircea Scarlat spoke of "illogical overbidding" in respect to Toma's encouragement during the 1950s. Also according to Scarlat, Marin Sorescu, a critically acclaimed poet who debuted in the post-1955 years, was "irritated by the method" of official poets such as Toma and Eugen Frunză, and contributed ironic pastiches of their work. Toma's Cîntecul bradului enjoyed more genuine success, and was famous for a while. The Romanian Revolution of 1989, which toppled the communist regime, was closely followed by open reevaluations of Toma's work and its entire context. In one such comment, written in 1990, writer Bujor Nedelcovici argued in favor of a progressive scale of guilt, on which the "naïve opportunism" of the 1950s ranked lower than the "shameful opportunism" of the 1970s and 1980s. This point raised objections from Ion Simuț, who replied that, for all the "changes in circumstances", Toma was no less objectionable than a Ceaușescu-era poet like Adrian Păunescu. He also believed that nothing in Toma's work as an official poet could be recovered: "A. Toma was so well adapted to the circumstances that his poetry cannot be removed from its context, and he shall forever remain in bondage, like a scribe without a modicum of independence."

In 1948, as editor of Scînteia, Sorin Toma took an active part in condemning Arghezi for noncompliance with the cultural guidelines. According to Ovid Crohmălniceanu, the dissenting communist and literary critic, the younger Toma simply acted on his father's "senile ambition" to replace Arghezi as the nation's leading poet. The episode had a perverse effect in liberal circles: Crohmălniceanu claims that he himself avoided ever citing Toma in his critical columns.

Arghezi's eventual rehabilitation, Florin Mihăilescu writes, came as both "an immediate effect" of Alexandru Toma's death and a sign of "progressive Destalinization." Sorin Toma also fell out of favor with the Communist Party (of whose Central Committee he had been a member in 1949–1960). Purged by the new uncontested leader Gheorghiu-Dej due to his support for Ana Pauker's group, he was expelled from the Party in 1963, and eventually immigrated to Israel. After the 1989 Revolution, exposed to criticism over his stances, and accused of having attacked Arghezi in order to promote his father, Sorin Toma claimed that he was just following orders from Party boss Iosif Chișinevschi (a defense notably present in his 2005 book of memoirs, Privind înapoi, "Looking Backwards").

=== Toma and George Călinescu ===
George Călinescu's position in support of Toma, alongside other situations where he endorsed the Communist regime, has been the target of controversy. The literary historian did not include Alexandru Toma in his minute History of Romanian Literature, which he had completed in 1941, seven years before Romania became Communist—there, Toma was only present in a bibliographical note. Speaking during the 1950s, he indicated that he had since come to "understand" the poet, and that he had been helped in this "by the lesson of the times". Lucian Boia noted that Călinescu's point made a distinction between purely aesthetic criteria, which Communism had come to associate with "the bourgeois era", and the supposed value of poets as "announcers and creators [...] of a new world".

Nevertheless, Călinescu was constantly ambivalent toward the Socialist Realist poet, and may have used his position to produce veiled criticism of Toma and the quality of his poetry. A minor scandal arose in early 1950, after Communist officials came to suspect that his Romanian Academy speech in honor of Toma was punctuated by double entendres. In his book of memoirs, Academy member and historian David Prodan recounted how, when speaking of how Toma had "selected his own path", Călinescu made a gesture that seemed to mimick a horse with blinders. Also according to Prodan, Toma was described by the speaker as having "coated himself in Eminescu chlamyde robe", which he had "tightened to fit his own body". The address alarmed members of the cultural establishment: Traian Săvulescu, urged on by the official historians Mihail Roller and Constantin Daicoviciu, asked George Călinescu to explain himself (the latter subsequently reiterated Toma's merits as a poet).

Boia argued that other samples of Călinescu's address may have been evidence of "mockery", hidden among eulogistic arguments—while noting that these did little to shadow his role in promoting Toma as a major poet, and that his overall attitude reminded one of "doublethink" (a concept coined by George Orwell in his dystopian novel Nineteen Eighty-Four). In reference to these two contradictory aspects, he cited Călinescu saying to Toma: "Not only are your lyrics indescribably beautiful artistically, but they highlight a combatant gray hairness, in love with the turmoil, instigating to an acute fight, a burning trust in progress. You are, allow me to say this, a master of clandestine poetry, enduring to this day as a professor of energy."

In the same context, Călinescu himself endorsed the parallel drawn between Alexandru Toma and Eminescu, while comparing the difference between their attitudes on life to Toma's advantage. Boia considered this stance especially problematic, given that the speaker was, at the time, the undisputed authority on Eminescu, and "the greatest literary critic alive".

After Toma's downfall and until the time of his own death, George Călinescu no longer made any noticeable reference to the poet. The revised edition of his History of Romanian Literature, written during the 1960s and republished by Alexandru Piru in 1982, included an abrupt mention of Toma, simply indicating his family and place of birth. According to Lucian Boia, this was Călinescu's way of "avenging his own cowardice from the years when he had contributed to launching 'the new Eminescu'."
