= Cremation in Romania =

Coordinates: 44°24′41″N 26°06′11″E

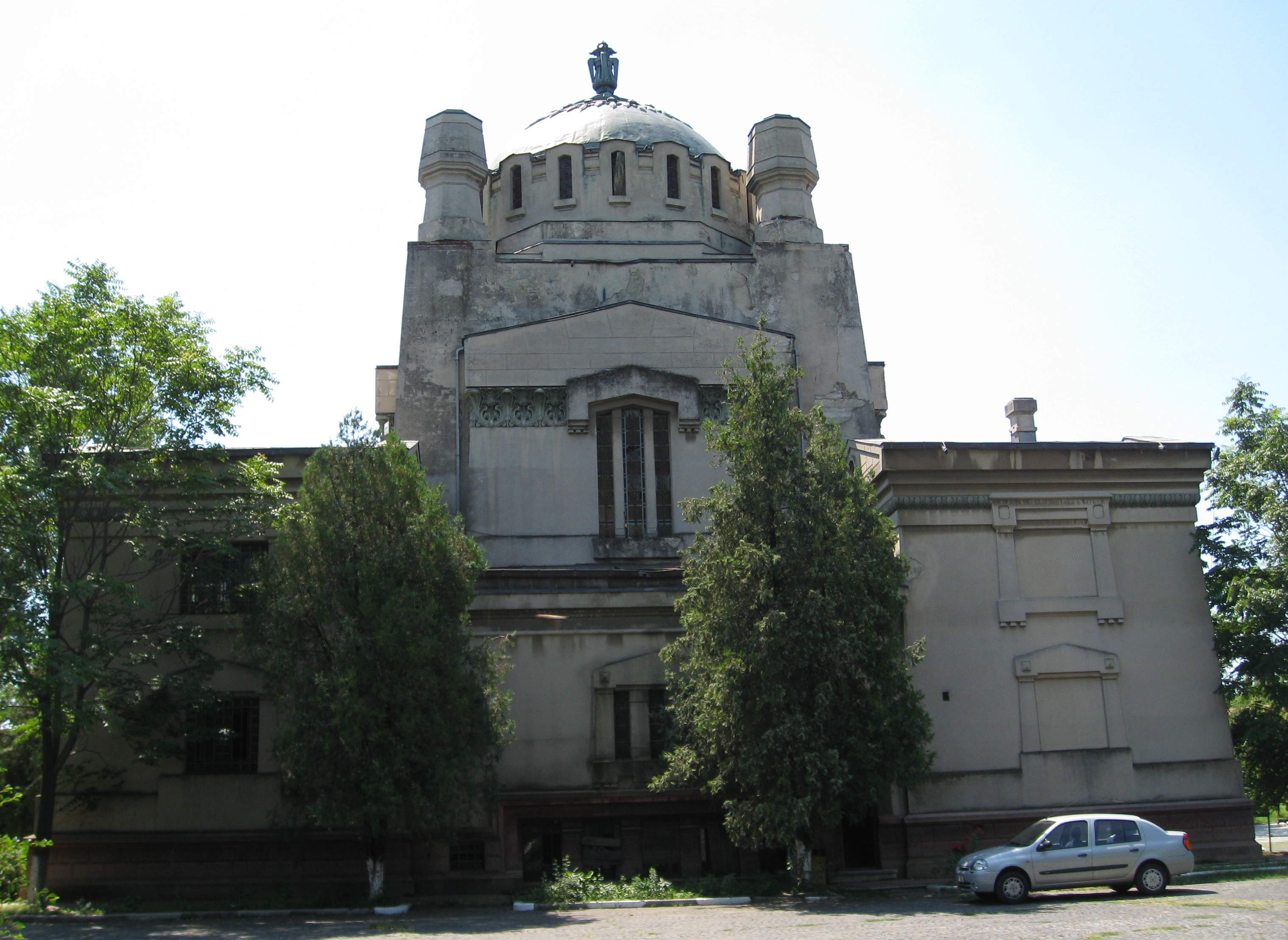
The "Cenușa" Crematorium in Bucharest

The 20th century history of cremation in Romania began in 1923, when the Romanian Cremation Society, called Cenușa ("Ashes"), was formed. In February 1928, the Bucharest Crematorium, also called Cenușa, began operations. It cremated 262 corpses that year, the figure rising to 602 in 1934. In 1935, 0.19% of Romania's dead were cremated there.

== History ==
Aside from the Soviet Union, Romania was the only nation in Eastern Europe to have an operational crematorium before World War II; although one was built in Debrecen, Hungary in 1932, it was not opened until 1951. In the interwar period, Cenușa was privately run and built the crematorium from its own funds. It faced opposition from the dominant Romanian Orthodox Church, which still prohibits cremation, and suffered from financial shortfalls. It was somewhat reliant on "administrative cremations" of, for instance, body parts from anatomical institutions, which paid well. By 1937, the society was making gains. It recruited 184 members that year, bringing the total to 1006. In 1934 it had begun an eight-page monthly journal, Flacăra Sacră (The Sacred Flame), focusing on domestic and international developments in the field. However, Cenușa failed to join the International Cremation Federation (ICF) when it was established in 1938.

World War II brought change to the status of cremation in Romania. In 1938, a cremator that had been ordered and paid for was not delivered before the war's outbreak. When Bucharest was bombed in 1944, the crematorium suffered considerable damage, leading to further financial difficulties for the society. However, religious opposition softened somewhat, and corpses from the provinces were brought in increasing numbers. In 1945 there were 600 cremations, up from 225 in 1944.

The contact established between the ICF and Cenușa in late 1946 was the last to occur for decades, as the Communist regime was installed soon after. During the Communist period, many prominent regime figures, including Gheorghe Gheorghiu-Dej, Chivu Stoica, and Teohari Georgescu, were cremated and had their ashes placed in the Monument of the Heroes for the Freedom of the People and of the Motherland, for Socialism in Bucharest's Carol Park, whence they were removed after the Romanian Revolution of 1989. The Internationale was customarily played for them at their cremation, although Ana Pauker's family had Beethoven's Third Symphony played instead.

By late 1987, the problems of Nicolae Ceaușescu's regime were also affecting cremation, as a power crisis meant that low gas pressure was insufficient to allow for full cremation of corpses. Anti-regime groups charged that some ashes were given to families and the half-cremated bodies disposed of in mass burials. However, corpses of wealthy and powerful figures were retained until sufficient pressure existed for a full cremation.

After a fairly rapid post-war advance, the incidence of cremation slowed considerably. A second crematorium, Vitan-Bârzești (named after the Bucharest neighbourhood where it is located), was opened in 1993, after Ceaușescu's fall from power. Nevertheless, in 1999, 1,172 cremations were performed in Romania, representing just 10% of deaths in Bucharest. In neighbouring Bulgaria, which opened its first crematorium in 2001, almost 5% of nationwide dead – 5,254 – were cremated in 2002.
