= Mate Maras =

Croatian translator (born 1939)

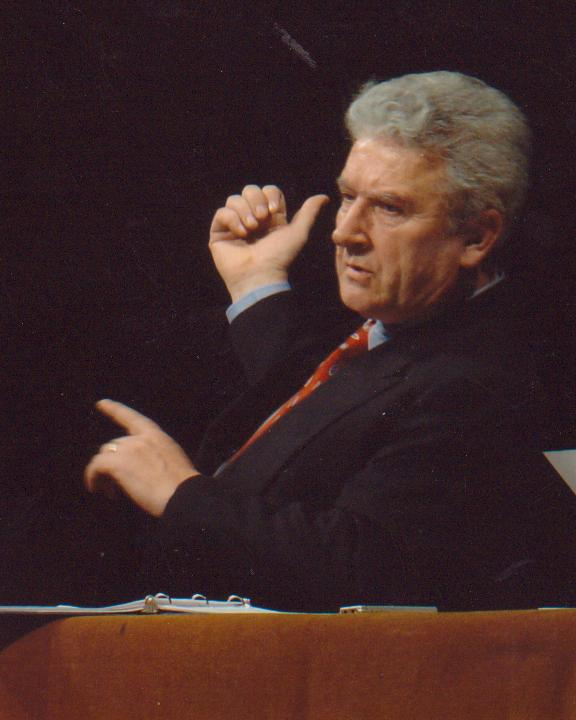
- Born: 2 April 1939 (age 87); Studenci near Imotski, Croatia
- Education: Faculty of Science, University of Zagreb
- Occupations: Translator, writer and poet
- Known for: His Croatian translations of Shakespeare, Rabelais, Dante, and others
- Awards: Order of Danica Hrvatska

–

Mate Maras (born 2 April 1939) is a Croatian translator. He has translated many famous classical and contemporary works from English, Italian and French into Croatian. He is the only man who translated the complete works of William Shakespeare into Croatian. His translation of Rabelais' Gargantua and Pantagruel earned him the grand prix of the French Academy. He wrote the first Croatian rhyming dictionary.

== Life and works ==
He was born in the village of Studenci, near Imotski, Croatia. His mother was a traditional folk poet whose songs chronicled local events. The Croatian dialect spoken in Studenci was later used by Maras for his translation of the sonnets of Giuseppe Gioachino Belli, originally written in the Romanesco dialect.

Maras graduated mathematics and physics from the Faculty of Science, University of Zagreb. He tried many careers, from geophysics to teaching to being a cultural attaché in Croatian embassies in Paris and Washington, DC. His cultural work includes editorial positions in several publishing houses, presiding the Croatian Translators' Society, and being the editor-in-chief of the cultural station (Treći Program) of the Croatian Radio.

He has been translating from English, Italian and French since his student days. The authors he translated include Dante, Petrarch, Milton, Scott, Kipling, Proust and Frost. He was awarded the Prize of the Croatian Translators' Society for his translation of Woolf's Mrs Dalloway and the grand prix of the French Academy for translating Rabelais' Gargantua and Pantagruel. In 2019, he was awarded the Order of Danica Hrvatska with the Effigy of Marko Marulić by the President of Croatia for outstanding work in translation and versatile contribution to the development of Croatian culture and its international reputation.

Maras was awarded an honorary doctorate from the Faculty of Philosophy of the University of Split in 2017.

=== Shakespeare ===
Maras is the only man who translated the complete works of William Shakespeare into Croatian. The translation was published in four volumes: Histories, Tragedies, Comedies, and Romances & Poetry (the last volume includes the problem plays).

The main novelty in relation to the previous Croatian translations is the verse translating method. A recurrent problem in the history of Shakespeare's translations in Croatia was the Croatian equivalent for the original blank verse. The usual practice was to choose a meter with a certain number of feet and stick to it, verse after verse. But its drawback was a rigid structure that often distorted the original, since it was usually too short to retain the full meaning of the original verse.

Instead of slavishly following a specific meter, Maras decided to remain as faithful as possible to the original meaning. For that reason, he introduced the principle of five "prominent points" in each verse. In fact, those were five relevant pieces of information from each original verse, to be translated in a poetic and rhythmic language akin to free verse, achieving an unprecedented fluent and natural flow of Shakespeare's plays in Croatian.

=== Own works ===
Maras published a collection of his own poetry, Kasna berba (A Late Vintage), in 2005. He wrote Grgur Ninski, a film script/history play about the medieval Croatian bishop Gregory of Nin, which was published in 2013.

In 2013, he wrote a novel about his emigrant father, Pisma od smrti (Letters From Death), "a monument to a life sacrificed in vain for vague ideals." When he published a collection of his mother's letters, Maras called it Pisma od života (Letters From Life).

He wrote the first Croatian rhyming dictionary.

== Major translations ==
=== From English ===
- Beowulf, Zagreb, 2001
- William Shakespeare, Complete Works, Zagreb, 2006–2008
- John Milton, Paradise Lost, Zagreb, 2013
- Walter Scott, Ivanhoe, Zagreb, 1987, 2000, 2004
- Thomas de Quincey, Confessions of an Opium Eater, Zagreb, 1987, Koprivnica, 2003
- Rudyard Kipling, The Jungle Book, Zagreb, 2004
- Virginia Woolf, Mrs Dalloway, Zagreb, 1981
- Thomas Wolfe, Look Homeward, Angel, Zagreb, 1978
- Dashiell Hammett, The Maltese Falcon, Koprivnica, 2003
- Robert Frost, Chosen Poems, Zagreb, 2006
- Doris Lessing, The Golden Notebook, Zagreb, 1983; Memoirs of a Survivor, Zagreb, 1985
- Barbara Tuchman, A Distant Mirror, Zagreb, 1984
- Robert M. Pirsig, Zen and the Art of Motorcycle Maintenance, Zagreb, 1982
- Haruki Murakami, Kafka on the Shore, Zagreb, 2009
- Vladimir Nabokov, Pale Fire, Zagreb, 2011
- Robert Browning, Selected Poems, Zagreb, 2018
- Alfred Tennyson, In Memoriam A.H.H., Zagreb, 2019

=== From French ===
- The Song of Roland, Zagreb, 2015
- Marie de France, Lais, Zagreb, 1999
- François Rabelais, Gargantua and Pantagruel, Zagreb, 2004
- Marcel Proust, Swann's Way, Zagreb, 2004

=== From Italian ===
- Guido Cavalcanti, Poems, Banja Luka, 1986, Zagreb, 1998
- Dante Alighieri, The Divine Comedy (Paradise XVIII–XXXIII), Zagreb, 1976, 2004
- Francesco Petrarca, Poems (with others), Zagreb, 1974
- Giovanni Boccaccio, Decameron (with Jerka Belan), Zagreb, 1981, 1999, 2004
- Jacopo Sannazaro, Arcadia, Zagreb, 2015
- Niccolò Machiavelli, Firentine Histories, Zagreb, 1985; Correspondence, Zagreb, 1987
- Giordano Bruno, Optimism of Free Thought (sonnets), Zagreb, 1985
- Giuseppe Gioachino Belli, Sonnets, Zagreb, 1994
- Alberto Fortis, Voyage to Dalmatia, Zagreb, 1985, Split, 2004
- Gabriele D'Annunzio, Giovanni Episcopo, Zagreb, 2004
- Italo Svevo, The Conscience of Zeno, Zagreb, 1982
- Giuseppe Tomasi di Lampedusa, The Leopard, Zagreb, 1982

=== From Spanish ===
- Cantar de mio Cid, Zagreb, 2018

=== From Romanian ===
- Mihai Eminescu, The Evening Star, Zagreb, 1995; Selected Poems, Zagreb, 2014

== Awards ==
- Prize of the Croatian Translators' Society for translating Mrs Dalloway.
- Grand Prix of the French Academy for translating Gargantua and Pantagruel.
- Iso Velikanović Award (2007) for translating Shakespeare's works and the lifetime award (2019).
- 2009: Award of the City of Zagreb for his translation opus.
- Official recognition of the State of Romania in 2012 for translating Eminescu and Geo Bogza.
- 2014: Kiklop Translator of the Year Award for translating Paradise Lost.
- 2014: Josip Tabak Award for life's work.
- Lauro Dantesco award for his translation of Dante.
- Order of Danica Hrvatska with the Effigy of Marko Marulić (2019)
