= Dumbrăveni, Suceava =

Dumbrăveni
- Commune
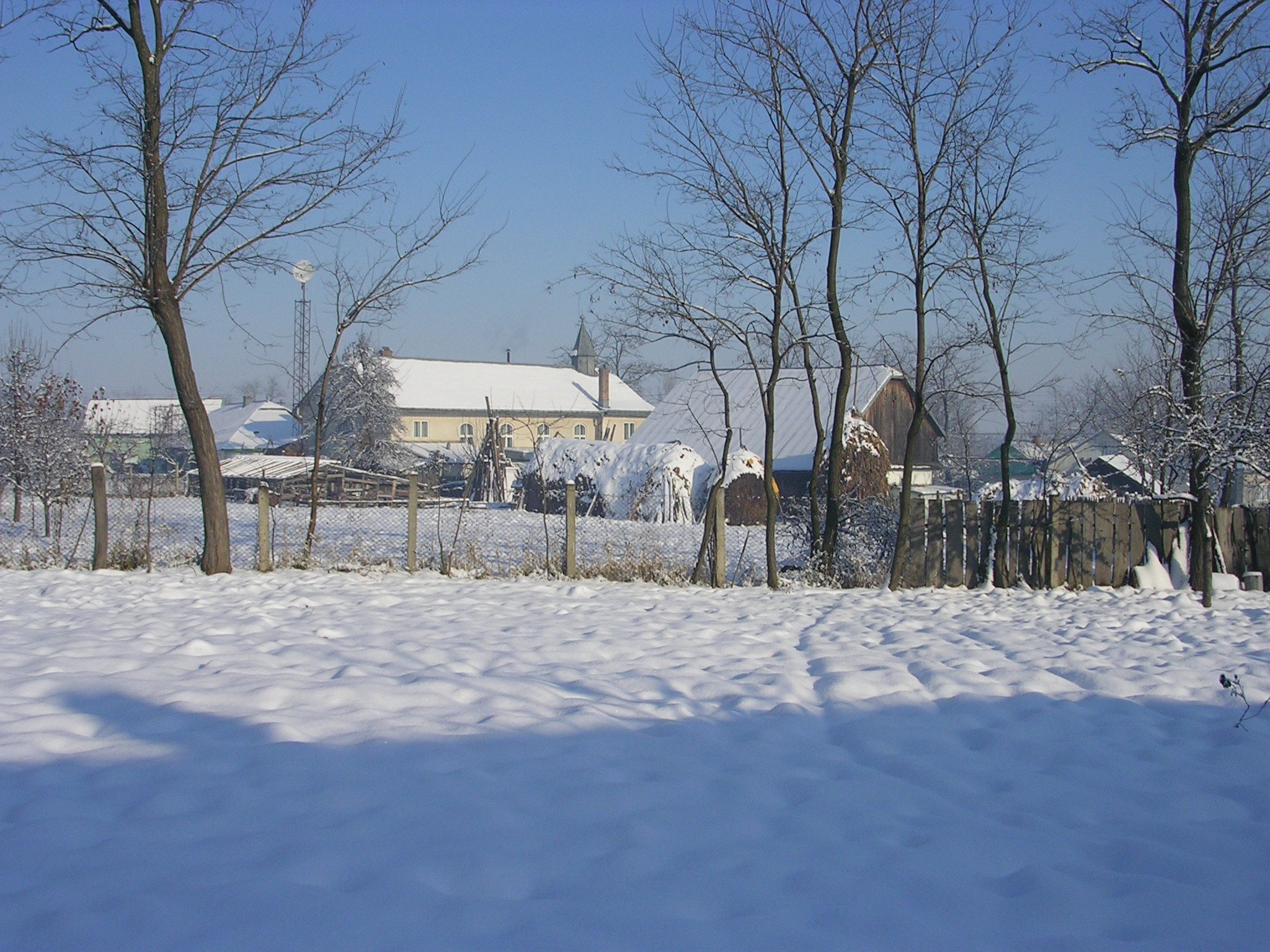
- Dumbrăveni in winter

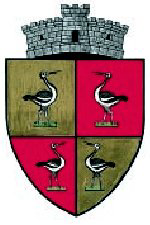
- Coat of arms

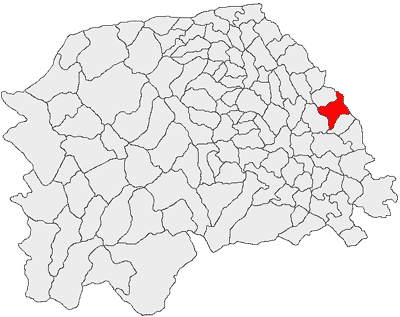
- Location in Suceava County

- Location in Romania
- Coordinates: 47°42′N 26°24′E
- Country: Romania
- County: Suceava

Government
  - Mayor (2024–2028): Ioan Pavăl (PSD)
- Area: 44.77 km^{2} (17.29 sq mi)
- Elevation: 283 m (928 ft)
- Population (2021-12-01): 7,988
  - Density: 178.4/km^{2} (462.1/sq mi)
- Time zone: UTC+02:00 (EET)
  - Summer (DST): UTC+03:00 (EEST)
- Postal code: 727225
- Area code: +40 230
- Vehicle reg.: SV
- Website: comuna-dumbraveni.ro

Dumbrăveni is a commune located in Suceava County, Romania. It is composed of two villages, Dumbrăveni and Sălăgeni.

The commune is located in the eastern part of Suceava County, 14 km (8.7 mi) from the county seat, Suceava, on the border with Botoșani County. The Suceava Ștefan cel Mare International Airport is 10 km (6.2 mi) to the northwest, in neighboring Salcea. Dumbrăveni is crossed by national road DN29 (part of European route E58), which connects Suceava to Botoșani.

In the early 20th century, Dumbrăveni was erroneously regarded by many as the birthplace of Mihai Eminescu, Romania's national poet. The last lines of his philosophical poem, Out of All the Masts, were engraved on a commemorative monument, erected by politician Leon Ghica on his estate in the village.

== Natives ==
- Ștefan Berariu (born 1999), rower
- Mihai Guriță (born 1973), footballer
