= International Cablemakers Federation =

The International Cablemakers Federation (ICF) was founded in 1990 with a permanent Secretariat in Vienna, Austria. Today ICF has more than 100 members from more than 30 countries of all regions in the world. The membership represents approx. 70% of the global manufacturing capacity of the Wire & Cable Industry.

== Objectives ==
The objectives defined by the constitution include, amongst others:

- the promotion of the use of cables
- the promotion of energy saving and increased safety
- the improvement of the recovery and re-use of cable materials
- the analysis and collation of statistical data of interest to the industry
- the maintenance of worldwide relationships within the Wire & Cable Industry whilst complying with all antitrust and cartel prohibition legislation, applicable to any of the members.

ICF publishes a quarterly Newsletter covering selected topics and industry statistics.

== See also ==
- Official Website: www.icf.at
- Integer Research
- Europacable
- The Wire Association International (WAI)
- Stewart Hay - Very useful links worldwide
