= Omar Lara =

Chilean poet (1941–2021)

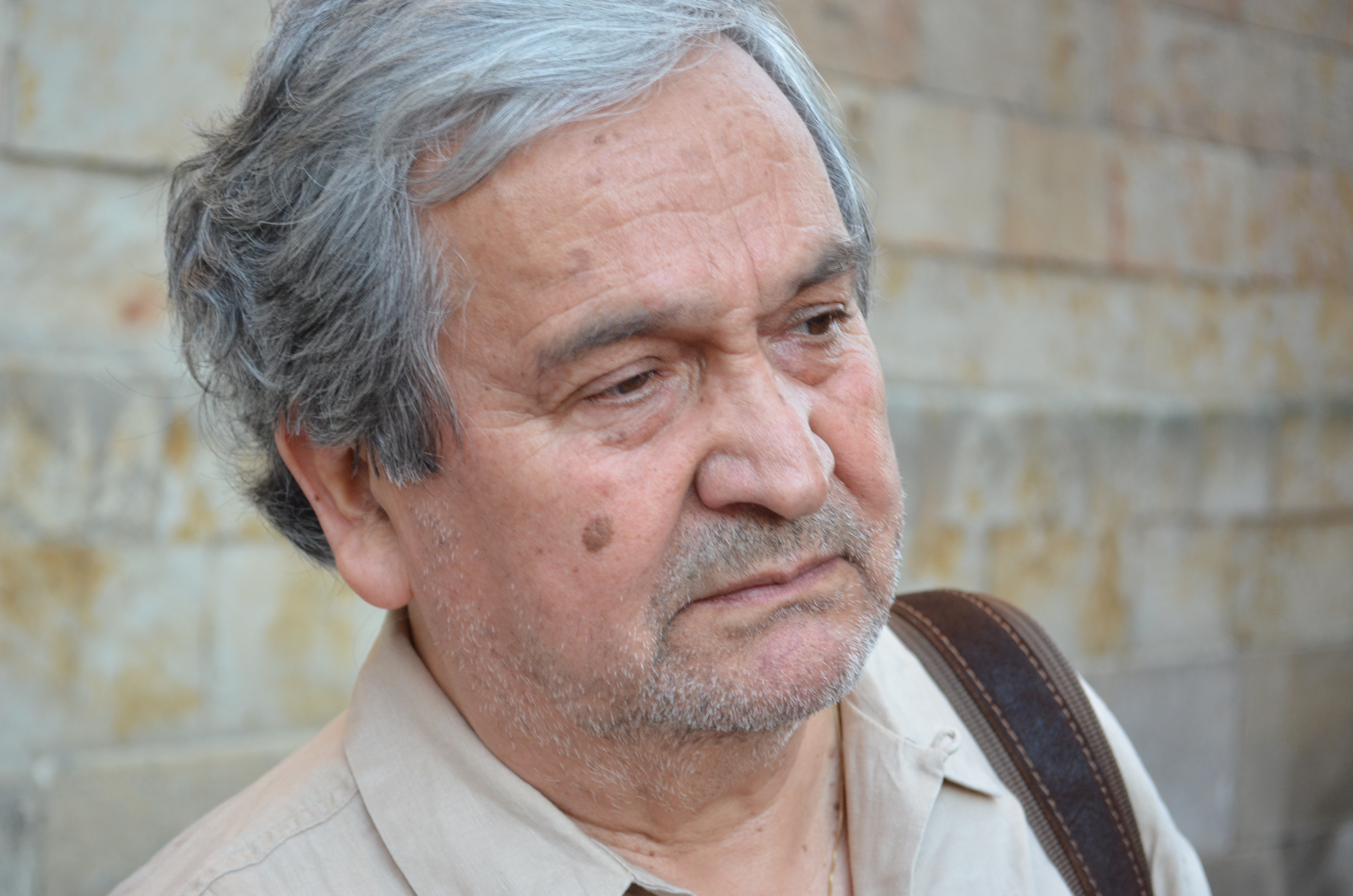
Lara in 2011

Luis Omar Lara Mendoza (June 9, 1941 – July 2, 2021) was a Chilean poet, translator, and editor.

== Awards ==
- 2007, Premio Casa de América de Poesía Americana
