= International Cremation Federation =

International organization

The International Cremation Federation
- Headquarters: The Hague, Netherlands
- Main organ: Pharos
- Website: www.int-crem-fed.org

The International Cremation Federation (ICF), found in 1937, is non-governmental and non-profit organization devoted to “promote the practice of cremation to the highest standard”.

In 1996, organization was granted Consultative Status by the Economic and Social Council of the United Nations. In compliance with its permission, organization can affect the international cremation movement and work of the UN. The Federation has accredited representatives at the UN headquarters and UN in both Vienna and Geneva for meetings of ECOSOC.
