= Corneliu M. Popescu =

Romanian translator of poetry (1958–1977)

Corneliu M. Popescu (Romanian pronunciation: [korˈnelju poˈpesku]; May 16, 1958 – March 4, 1977) was a Romanian translator of poetry who died at the age of 18 in the earthquake of 1977.

A poetry translation prize was established in 2003 in commemoration of his work. Called the Popescu Prize, it is awarded bi-annually by the Poetry Society for poetry translated from a European language into English. In the Guardian Review on 20 September 2003, there appeared an article by the poet Alan Brownjohn about his participation in judging the award for that year. A segment of a translation Popescu made for one of Mihai Eminescu's poems is included in the article, along with a photograph of Popescu.
