= Tiberiu Olah =

Hungarian-Romanian composer and musicologist (1928–2002)

Tiberiu Olah (2 January 1928 – 2 October 2002) was a Romanian composer, teacher, and musicologist of Hungarian ethnicity.

== Biography ==
Olah was born in Arpășel village, Batăr commune, Bihor County, the son of Ioan Olah, a notary, and Maria Olah, née Molnar. After going to elementary school is his native commune, he attended from 1938 to 1940 the King Carol II High School in nearby Salonta, and then went to Oradea, completing his secondary education in 1946 at the Emanuil Gojdu High School. He then moved to Cluj, where he began his musical studies at the Cluj Conservatory. From 1949 to 1954, he studied at the Moscow Conservatory. In 1954 he settled in Bucharest, where he lived in an apartment on Calea Victoriei. In 1958 he took a position as a lecturer and later as a professor at the Bucharest Conservatory. Notable students include Doina Rotaru, Costin Miereanu, Horațiu Rădulescu, and Christian Wilhelm Berger.

In 1959, he married Ivonne Săucan. He did much of his composing in a small peasant house he had purchased in Gruiu, near Bucharest. From 1966 to 1969, he participated in summer courses in Darmstadt, and in 1969–1970 he took part in the Study and Creation Internship at the Academy in West Berlin, with support from a DAAD grant. Olah was a member of the Csodamalom Bábszínház puppet theater, where he acted as a puppeteer. He received grants for research in musicology and presented studies and papers internationally. He also published reviews and articles in journals such as Studii de Muzicologie, Muzica, România Literară, and Melos.

After his wife died in 1998, his health deteriorated, and he moved to Târgu Mureș to stay with his sister, Edit Gogolak. He died there in 2002, at age 74.

== Works ==
Olah composed orchestral and chamber music works in which he was initially inspired by Béla Bartók, George Enescu, and Igor Stravinsky and later by the Second Viennese School, including a five-part cycle dedicated to the sculptor Constantin Brâncuși, as well as cantatas, an oratorio, choral works, and film music. He was known for popularizing the oratorio. Selected compositions include:

- Cantata for women's choir, two flutes, string and percussion instruments 1956, Csángó popular texts, translated by Nina Cassian
- Prind visele aripi 1959, cantata for mixed choir and orchestra
- Lumina lui Lenin 1959, cantata for male choir and string orchestra on lyrics by Nina Cassian
- O stâncă se înalță 1959, cantata for mixed choir and orchestra lyrics by Maria Banuș
- The Galaxy of Man 1960, oratorio for reciter, high voice, mixed choir and orchestra by Vladimir Mayakovsky lyrics
- Symphony 1956
- Michael the Brave 1970, symphonic suite from the music of the Sergiu Nicolaescu film
- Homonymous Crescendo 1972, piece for orchestra
- Condemnation 1976, music video

His music has been recorded and issued on media including:

- [Electrecord ST-ECE 02941] Invocations III, Harmonies IV, Sonata for Clarinet solo, Sonata for Flute solo, Space and Rhythm (LP, 1986)
- [Electrecord ST-CS 0201] Daniel Kientzy - Stockhausen / Cavanna / Harrison / Olah / Ioachimescu- Saxophone Contemporain (LP, 1986)

== Awards ==
- George Enescu Prize of the Romanian Academy, 1965
- White Pelican Prize of ACIN for film music, 1966 and 1971
- Koussewitzky International Prize for Coloana Infinită, United States, 1967
- Grand Prize of the Union of Composers and Musicologists of Romania for lifetime achievement, 1993
