= Salonta City Hall =

Headquarters of local government in Salonta, Bihor County, Romania

Coordinates: 46°48′09″N 21°39′34″E

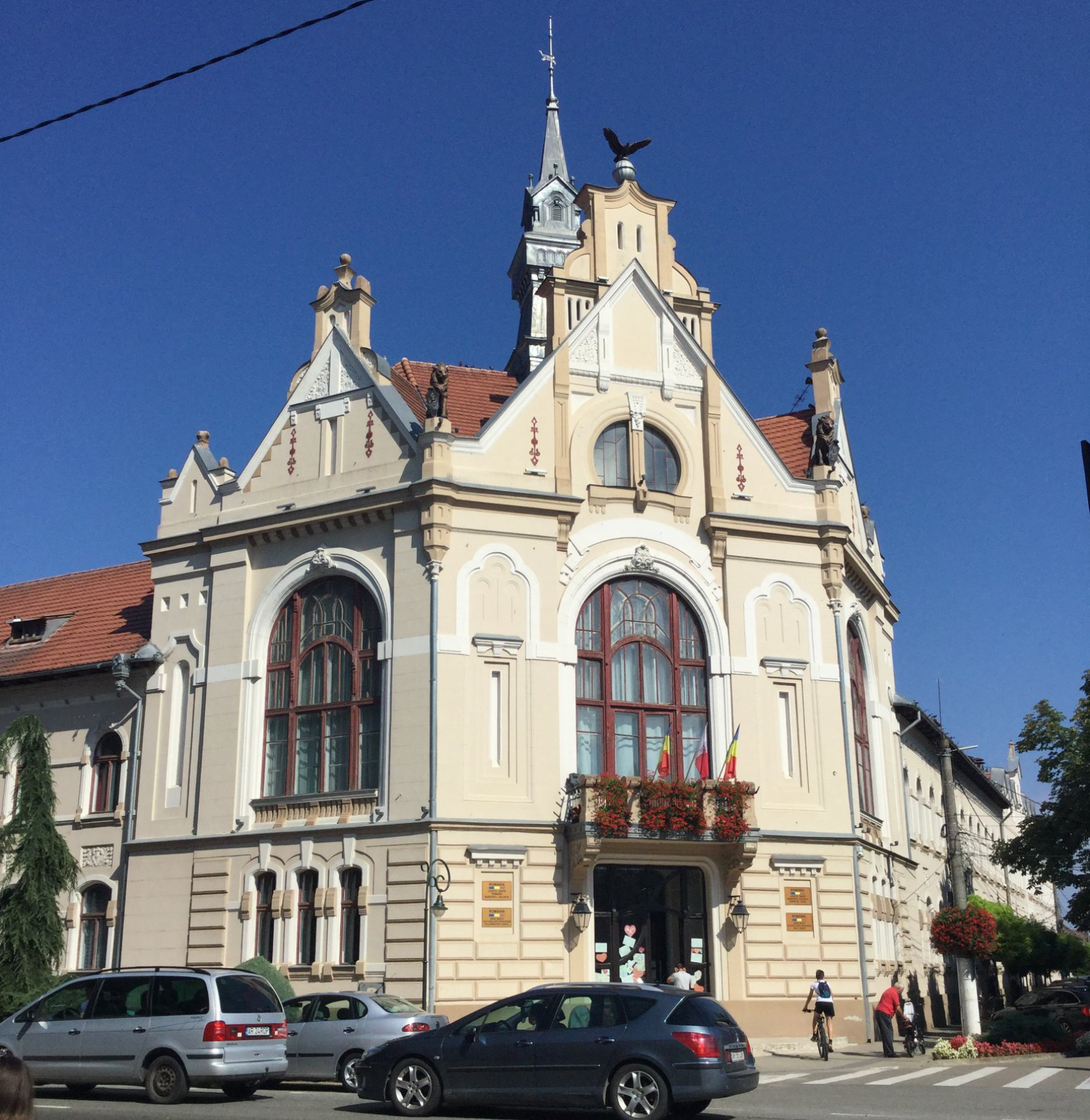
Salonta City Hall

The Salonta City Hall is the headquarters of local government in Salonta, Bihor County, Romania. It is situated at 1 Republicii Street.

The building was constructed during the Austro-Hungarian period, between 1906 and 1907, in Art Nouveau style. The architect was László Székely, a native of Salonta.

The building has three symmetrical façades, with a ground and upper floor. Overlooking the former market square is the prominent center section, located on a street corner. The main entrance is in this part, with an ornate balcony above.

There are large semicircular windows in all three directions, topped by a triangular roof gable. Among the gable decorations are the lion from the Bocskai family coat of arms, and a native János Arany holding his family arms. The interior features an ornate staircase and a richly decorated ballroom.

The building is listed as a historic monument by Romania's Ministry of Culture and Religious Affairs.
