= Csodamalom =

Puppet theater in Miskolc, Hungary

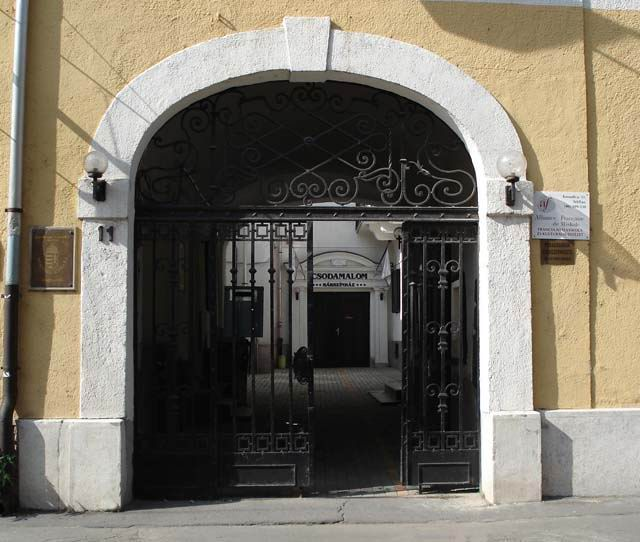
Csodamalom entrance

Csodamalom Bábszínház (Magic Mill Puppet Theatre) is a puppet theater in Miskolc, Hungary. It was formed by puppeteer Tibor Korzsény in 1986 as an amateur company. The name "Csodamalom" (Magic Mill) preserves the name of Fábián Mill, the company that once operated there. The theatre was semi-official since 1988 and became official in 1992. The theater maintains 50 plays in repertoire and premiers two or three shows/year, usually a classical folk tale. Uniquely in Hungary, they play musical puppet shows, including puppet-pantomimes staged for adults, such as Pictures at an Exhibition by Mussorgsky, Bolero by Ravel and Carmina Burana by Orff.

== History ==
In 1947 László Bod, later the director of Budapest State Puppet Theatre, tried to establish the genre in Miskolc.

In the middle 1980s, in the building known as Fábián Mill, two groups started work. The first to perform there was a troupe led by János Czikora until 1989. The other group was the Csodamalom Puppet Theatre established in 1986 by Tibor Korzsény, who was a member of the State Puppet Theatre before, and an artist of the Tokaj Varieté.

The first performance was on 26 September 1986 under Korzsényi. It was an adaptation of Hansel and Gretel. The artists, including Anna Molnár, Valéria Egerszegi, Aszterisz Pacadisz were members of the Tokaj Varieté, except Ildikó Gyürek.

Following this, Korzsényi gathered young people interested in the genre. In September, 1990 the higher education of puppeteers was launched with twelve students, under the professional supervision of the State Puppet Theatre. The first shows' puppets were designed by Vera Bródy, and made in the workshop of the State Puppet Theatre by applied artist Emőke Szabó. The scenery was made in the workshop of the National Theatre of Miskolc under the direction of Attila Veres. Accompanying music was Miskolc, music teacher János Zoller and organist László Csabai.

The group soon outgrew its original location. In 1988 the theatre company, then the amateur puppetry of the City Cultural Centre, received a group operational permit from the National Philharmony. From 1992 the company was granted a license to work as professional theatre, and relocated to the building of the former Studio Theatre in Kossuth Street, where they established their own workshop.

== Techniques ==
In the beginning they carried on the traditions of the State Puppet Theatre playing mainly classic puppet shows for young children.

Later, the group's professional activities became characterized by its variety of techniques and genres. Among others the group put up plays based on Roma genesis legends, but their series featuring traditional European fai puppet-show stories, or the stories of Czechoslovak cartoons formerly very popular in Hungary. They eventually built up a unique repertoire.

Beside hand or glove puppets they make Wayang puppets, and amongst the flat-puppets cut out from paper and installed onto posts, marionettes. Puppets in the King Mátyás tales are moved with a Sicilian marionette technique, while objects transformed into real actors in Rosszcsont Peti (Naughty Peter).

== Personnel ==
=== Directors ===
- Judit Juhász: art director
- Erzsébet M.Németh: director
- Mária Jákfalvi, Labodáné: financial director

=== Puppeteers ===
- Gáspár Zsolt Hajdú
- Ildikó Heiszmann, Nívó-Prize puppeteer
- Zsolt Klim
- Szabolcs Károlyi, puppeteer trainee
- Laura Kulcsár, puppeteer trainee
- Bernadett Láng
- Edit Tar
- Gábor Tulipán
- Tibor Oláh

=== Workshop ===
- Ildikó Juhász, Barnáné: painter, puppet- and set designer
- Laczy, Barna: creative co-worker
- Iboly Sipos, Barnáné: administrator
- Zsolt Méhes: stagecraftician
- Zsoltné Dr. Máthé: janitor
- Sándorné Mikle: seater
- Endre Papp: repairman
- Zoltán Polacsek: decorator
- István Szabó:decorator
- Norbert Szarka: decorator
- Lajos Veres: organiser
- Lászlóné Vizsolyi: cloakroom attendant
- Csba István Újvári: scenic and puppet designer
- György Zábrátzky: scene maker
