= Teodor Neș National College =

Coordinates: 46.8059°N 21.6469°E

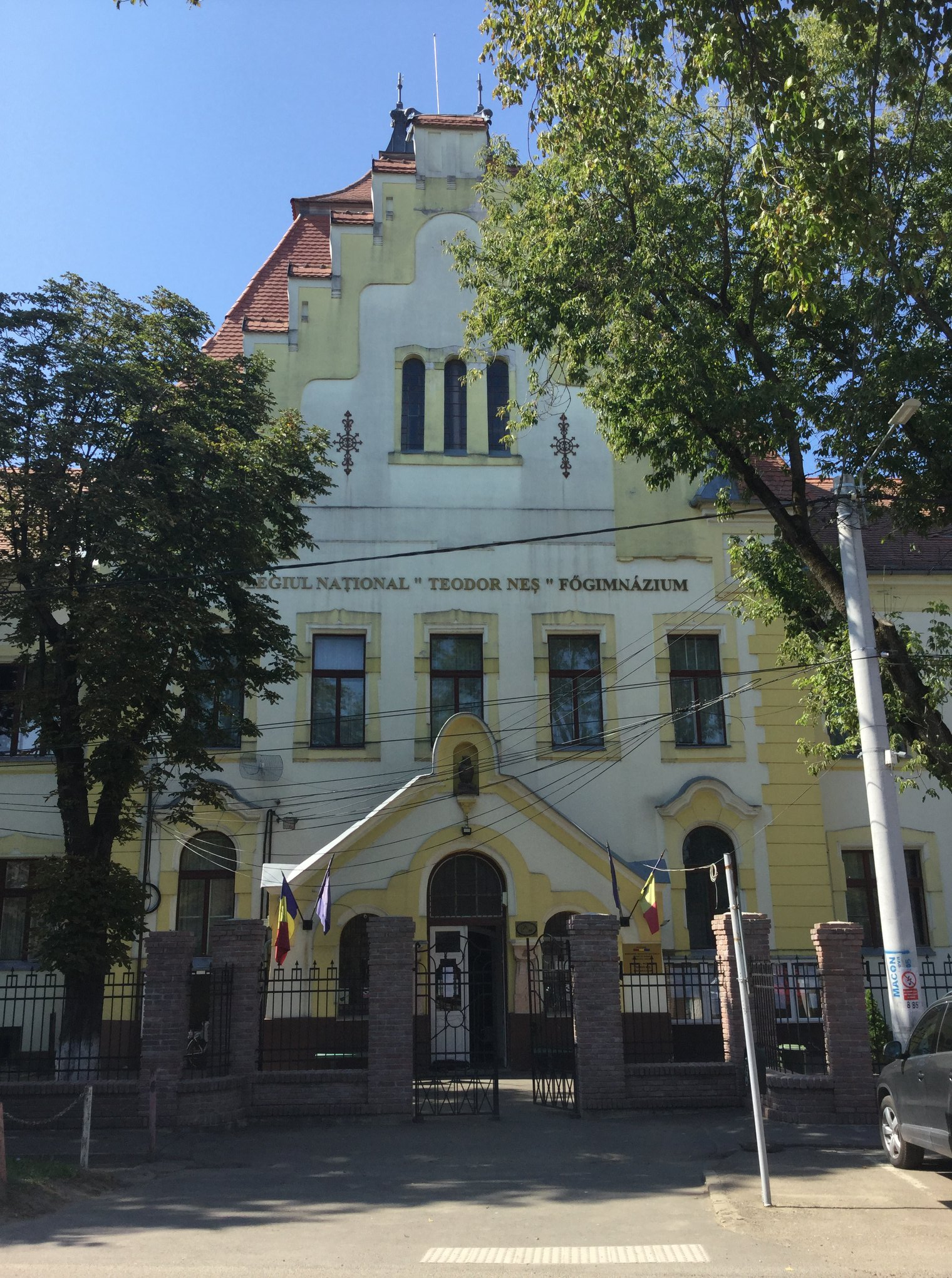
Teodor Neș National College

Teodor Neș National College (Romanian: Colegiul Național Teodor Neș) is a high school located at 90 Republicii Street, Salonta, Romania.

In 1903–1904, at a time when the area belonged to Austria-Hungary, the city council, followed by the Bihar County council, requested the establishment of a high school. This was approved by the national government, and the institution opened in autumn 1907 as the county's first state high school. The building, designed by László Székely, was completed two years later. Romanian-language classes were introduced in 1919, following the union of Transylvania with Romania, while Hungarian classes continued. A dormitory and cafeteria opened in 1922. The school was in danger of closure in 1931, and was downgraded to a gymnasium the following year, named after King Carol II. Upper-level classes were reintroduced in 1937; the school acquired an agricultural orientation in 1938, but this was not a success.

In 1941, under the Hungarian rule that followed the Second Vienna Award, the school was named after poet János Arany. After the end of World War II and the resumption of Romanian control, it was a Romanian-Hungarian gymnasium for three years. In 1948, the new communist regime established a professional agricultural school, training tractor drivers and rice growers. It returned to the status of a regular high school in 1955, with frequent name changes. It became an industrial high school in 1978. From 1996, it was again a standard high school, with grades 1–12 operating in the building. It was declared a national college in 2007. From 2012, classes are exclusively in Romanian. In 2013, the school was renamed for journalist Teodor Neș.

The school building is listed as a historic monument by Romania's Ministry of Culture and Religious Affairs.

== Alumni ==
- Tiberiu Olah, composer
