= Andra Ursuța =

Romanian-American sculptor

- Born: 1979 (age 46–47)
- Education: Columbia University (BA)
- Occupation: Sculptor

Andra Ursuța (born 1979) is a Romanian-American sculptor who has lived and worked in New York since 2000. Ursuța is known for her nihilistic portrayal of the human condition, confronting issues such as patriotism, violence against women, and the “expulsion of ethnic groups”. Ursuța's work is held in public collections worldwide.

== Early life ==
Ursuța was born in 1979 in Salonta, (Hungarian: Nagyszalonta) Romania, a town on the Hungary–Romania border under the Communist leadership of Nicolae Ceaușescu. She emigrated to the United States in 1997, and moved to New York in 1999. In 2002, Ursuța received a Bachelor of Arts in Art History and Visual Arts from Columbia University School of the Arts in New York City.

== Career ==
Ursuța's works draw on her personal narrative, while simultaneously speaking to mutually defined cultural experiences. Ursuța uses a variety of media, merging traditional sculpture with new technologies to transform common materials into visceral sculptures and installations.

Many of Ursuța's sculptures begin as assemblages of vessels, scrap materials, and renderings of the human body. Conceptually, Ursuța's sculptures contain a collection of cultural references ranging from rock-n-roll to health cults. Ursuța has been named "a master of materials, craft, form, political commentary, recent history, magical insight and sculptural power" for her weaving of the visual and the conceptual.

Ursuța has stated that she is no crusader, and that she's "just... reflecting unspoken attitudes that form the undercurrent of images and news stories, and the way contemporary experience is framed."

In her Stoner (2013) installation, Ursuța uses a fenced-off pitching machine that hurtles round rocks at a tiled wall containing strands of long, black hair (as if depicting that women are walled up inside) to explore themes of organized misogyny, jock culture, and competitive aggression.

In a 2012 New York Times review of Ursuța's Magical Terrorism, the newspaper's chief art critic Roberta Smith notes a relationship between Ursuța's personal experience and a wider generational experience. The sculptures contrast “systems of belief, economics and display, as well as different states of otherness. The disturbing impression is of time running backward, of civilization devolving.”

More recent shows by Ursuța combine both cutting-edge and ancient processes in their construction. Ursuța's "Nobodies" (2019) — with its six glass sculptures – uses both 3-D printing and ancient lost-wax casting, contrasting free will and choice, life and death, and ambition and helplessness. As described in an essay by Chris Wiley, this work captures the human tendency to “strive and stretch and sweat our way towards a more perfect body, and a calmer, clearer mind, [although] the undertow of decay will always be too strong for us to fight." The sculptures, the delicacy of their material and the intimacy of their forms, offer a sobering truth that “our bodies and our histories will vanish, like raindrops in an ocean squall. All of this might be for nothing, all of us might be nobodies.” As Ursuța defamiliarizes the bodily form, the remaining figures perhaps reveal "...our brains…locked in the prisons of our dying bodies." In the 2022 Venice Biennale, Ursuța's work was noted in the Telegraph as being "simultaneously alluring and unsettling crystalline figures, like cyborg amputees imagined by a female alter ego of Jacob Epstein." Ursuța's exhibit in the show was also noted in a review by Vanity Fair.

== Collections ==
Ursuţa's work is held in public collections worldwide, including the Aïshti Foundation, Beirut; DESTE Foundation for Contemporary Art, Athens; Fondazione Sandretto Re Rebaudengo, Turin, Italy; Hammer Museum, University of California, Los Angeles; Institute of Contemporary Art, Miami; and the Rubell Museum, Miami; and the Pérez Art Museum Miami, Florida. Ursuţa has been featured in three Venice biennials: 2013, 2019, and 2022. Ursuţa lives and works in New York.

=== Solo exhibitions ===
Ursuța's first solo exhibition – Andra Ursuța: The Management of Barbarism – was displayed in 2010 at Ramiken Crucible, NY. Since 2010, Ursuța's work has been the subject of solo exhibitions at prominent venues in the U.S. as well as internationally.

- 2010: The Management of Barbarism, Ramiken Crucible, New York, NY
- 2011: Vandal Lust, Ramiken Crucible, New York, NY
- 2012: Storage Space, Ramiken Crucible, New York, NY
- 2012: Magical Terrorism, Ramiken Crucible, New York, NY
- 2012: Mothers, Let Your Daughters Out Into the Streets, Francois Ghebaly Gallery, Los Angeles, CA
- 2013: Solitary Fitness, Venus Over Manhattan, New York, NY
- 2014: Fartchitectures, The Peep-Hole Art Center, Milan, Italy
- 2014: Hammer Projects: Andra Ursuţa, Hammer Museum, University of California, Los Angeles, CA
- 2014: Scytheseeing, Kölnischer Kunstverein, Cologne, Germany
- 2014: Tongue Mops and Bunny Pictures, Ramiken Crucible, New York, NY
- 2014–2015: As I Lay Drying, Institute of Contemporary Art, Miami, FL
- 2015: Enslavables, Massimo De Carlo, London, England
- 2015: Ο Νότος θα εγερθεί ξανα, Ramiken Crucible, New York, NY
- 2015: Whites, Kunsthalle Basel, Basel, Switzerland
- 2016: Andra Ursuţa: Alps, The New Museum, New York, NY
- 2017: The Man from the Internet, Massimo De Carlo, Milan, Italy
- 2018–2019: Andra Ursuţa: Vanilla Isis, Fondazione Sandretto Re Rebaudengo, Turin, Italy
- 2019: Nobodies, Ramiken, New York, NY
- 2021: Void Fill, David Zwirner Gallery, Paris, France
- 2025: Apocalypse Now and Then, DESTE Foundation Project Space, Idra, Greece

=== Group exhibitions ===
Ursuța's work has also been included in several domestic and international group exhibitions.

- 2011: Ostalgia, New Museum, New York, NY
- 2013–2014: Busted, The High Line, New York, NY
- 2013: Expo 1: New York, MoMA PS1, New York, NY
- 2013: The 55th Venice Biennale: The Encyclopedic Palace, Venice, Italy
- 2015: Artists and Poets, Secession, Vienna, Austria
- 2015–2016: The 13th Lyon Biennale: La vie moderne, Lyon, France
- 2016–2017: High Anxiety: New Acquisitions, Rubell Museum, Miami, FL
- 2017: A Good Neighbour: 15thIstanbul Biennial, Istanbul, Turkey
- 2017–2018: The Trick Brain, Aïshti Foundation, Beirut, Lebanon
- 2019: The 58th Venice Biennale: May You Live In Interesting Times, Venice, Italy
- 2019: The Warmth of Other Suns: Stories of Global Displacement, The Phillips Collection, Washington, DC
- 2020: 20/20, David Zwirner, New York, NY
- 2022: Vessels, David Zwirner, London, England
- 2022: The 59th Venice Biennale: The Milk of Dreams, Venice, Italy
Sculptures by Ursuța exhibited in the Summer Exhibition 2018 at Middelheim Open Air Sculpture Museum

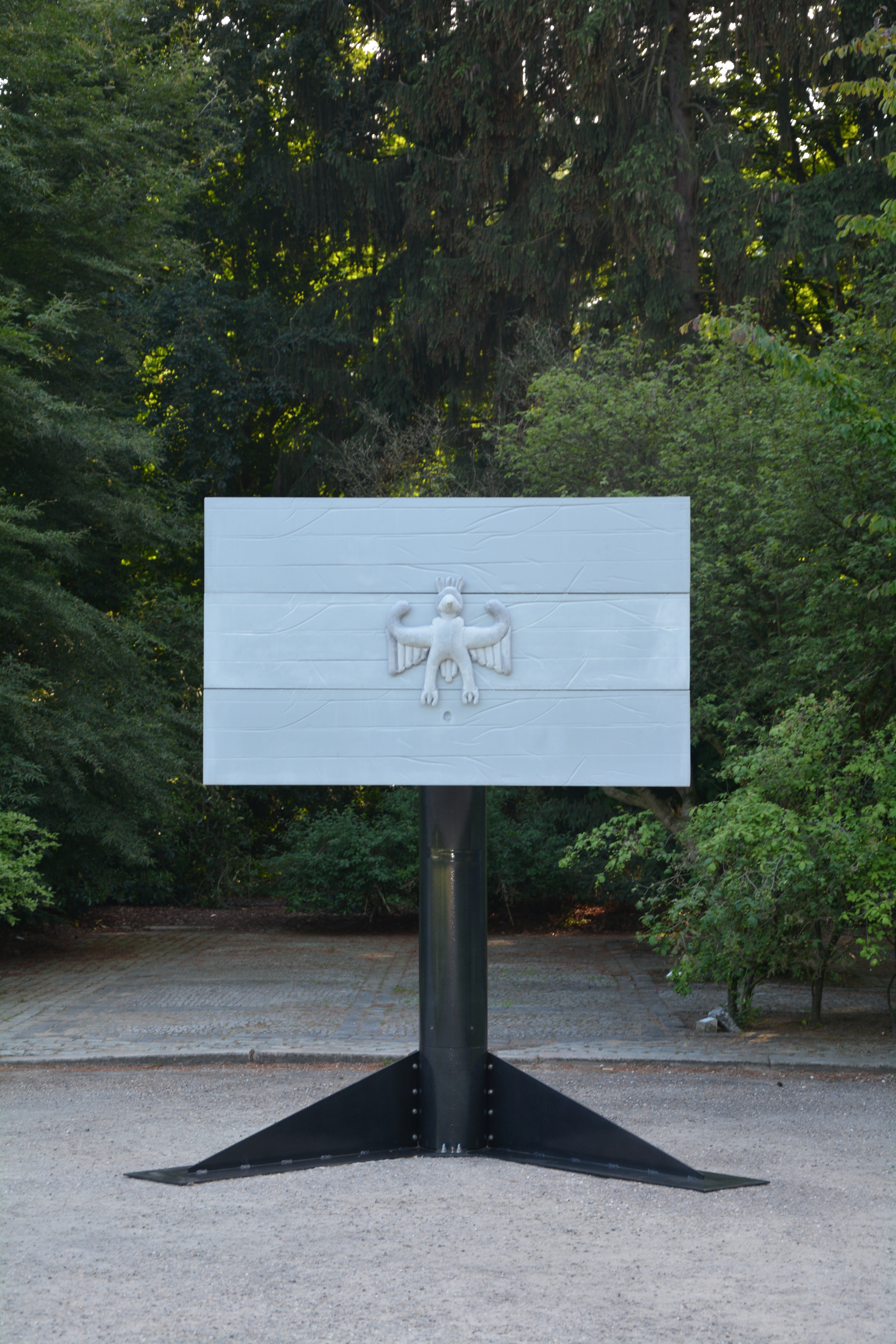
Scarecrow

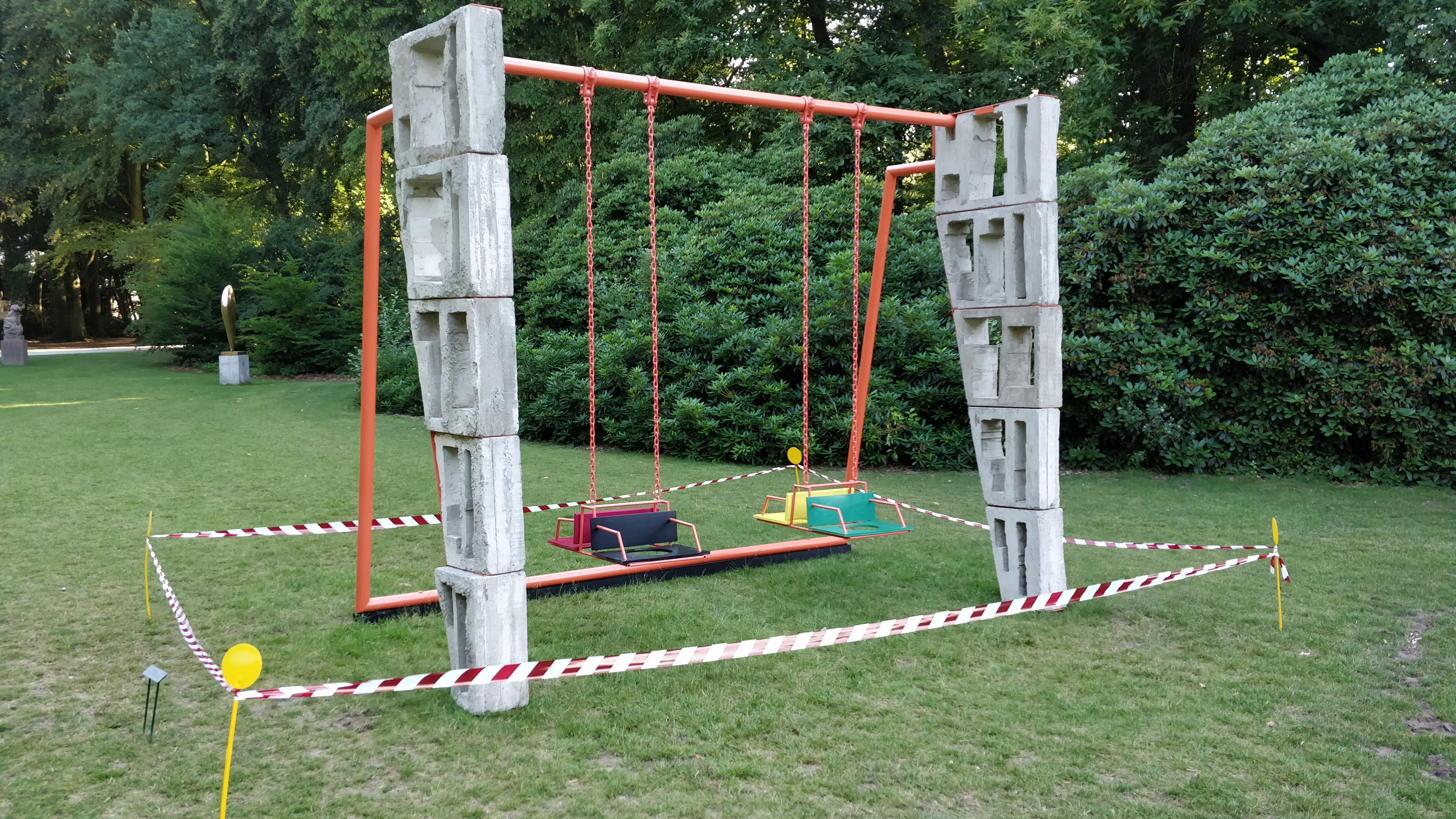
Natural Born Artist

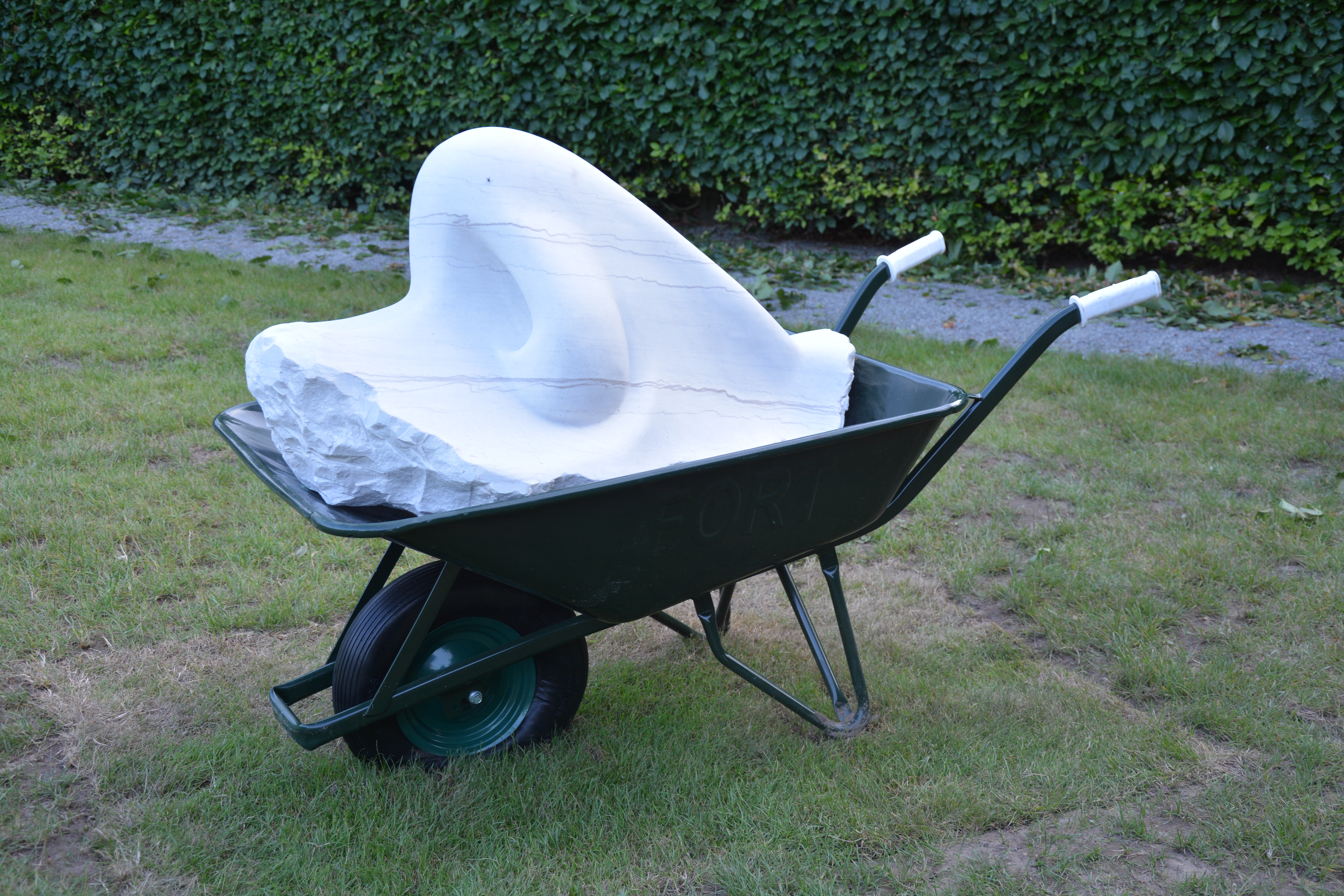
Nose Job

== Sources ==
- Andra Ursuța: Alps, ISBN 9781942607328, 1942607326
- Andra Ursuța: 2000 Words ISBN 9786185039271, 6185039273
- The Choreographic ISBN 9780262325998, 0262325993
- Engaging Art, Essays and Interviews from Around the Globe ISBN 9781527550698, 1527550699
- The Fifth BMW Art Guide by Independent Collectors – The Global Guide to Private Collections of Contemporary Art. ISBN 9783775744997, 3775744991
