= Mircea Pavlov =

Romanian chess player (born 1937)

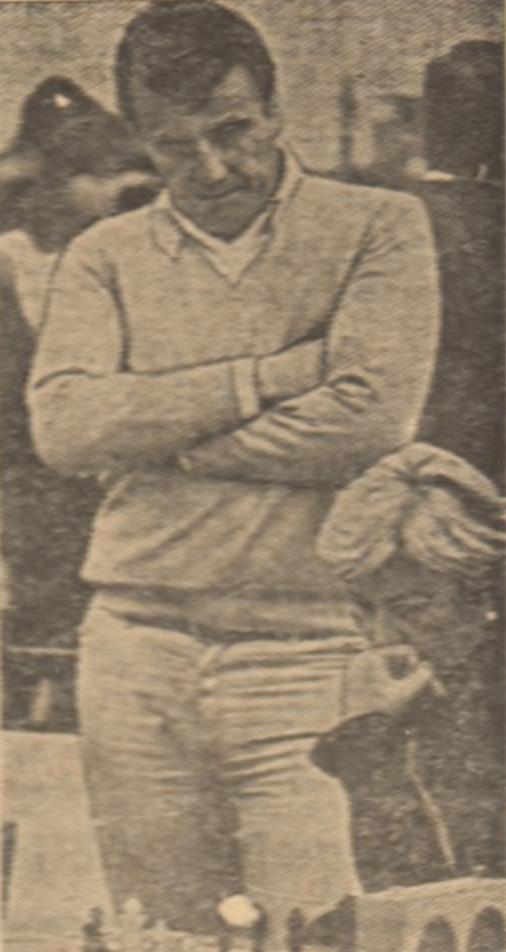

Personal information
- Born: 14 September 1937 (age 88) Salonta, Romania

Chess career
- Country: Romania
- Title: International Master (1977)
- Peak rating: 2415 (January 1981)

Mircea Pavlov (born 14 September 1937) is a Romanian chess International Master (1977), three-times Romanian Chess Championship medalist (1962, 1980, 1984), European Team Chess Championship individual bronze medal winner (1973).

== Biography ==
From the mid-1960s to the mid-1980s Mircea Pavlov was one of the leading Romanian chess players. He has participated many times in the individual finals of Romanian Chess Championship and three times won bronze medals (1962, 1980, 1984). Twice Mircea Pavlov participated in FIDE Zonal chess tournaments: in Halle in 1963 and in Băile Herculane in 1982. In 1976 he was twice successful played in international chess tournaments, participated in Istres (shared 2nd-3rd place) and Bucharest (shared 2nd place with József Pintér, Evgeny Sveshnikov and Leif Øgaard, behind Theodor Ghițescu). In 1977, he was awarded the FIDE International Master (IM) title.

Mircea Pavlov played for Romania in the Chess Olympiad:

- In 1974, at first reserve board in the 21st Chess Olympiad in Nice (+4, =3, -3).

Mircea Pavlov played for Romania in the European Team Chess Championships:

- In 1965, at eight board in the 3rd European Team Chess Championship in Hamburg (+2, =6, -2),
- In 1973, at sixth board in the 5th European Team Chess Championship in Bath (+1, =6, -0) and won individual bronze medal,
- In 1977, at first reserve board in the 6th European Team Chess Championship in Moscow (+1, =3, -1).

Mircea Pavlov played for Romania in the World Student Team Chess Championship:

- In 1964, at second board in the 11th World Student Team Chess Championship in Kraków (+5, =5, -1),
- In 1965, at second board in the 12th World Student Team Chess Championship in Sinaia (+3, =4, -2).

Mircea Pavlov played for Romania in the Men's Chess Balkaniads:

- In 1971, at first reserve board in the 3rd Men's Chess Balkaniad in Athens (+1, =1, -0) and won team gold and individual silver medals,
- In 1973, at sixth board in the 5th Men's Chess Balkaniad in Poiana Brașov (+1, =0, -1) and won team silver and individual bronze medals,
- In 1976, at fifth board in the 8th Men's Chess Balkaniad in Athens (+1, =0, -1) and won team bronze and individual silver medals.
