= Doina Rotaru =

Romanian composer (born 1951)

Marilena Doinița Rotaru (known as Doina, also Nemţeanu-Rotaru; born 14 September 1951, Bucharest) is a Romanian composer best known for her orchestral and chamber works. She has won prizes from the Romanian Composers' Union seven times, and was awarded the Romanian Academy of Arts and Sciences prize in 1986. She won first prize in the GEDOK Competition in Mannheim in 1994 for her second symphony. She is a professor of harmony at the Bucharest Conservatory.

== Biography ==
Marilena Doinița Rotaru was born in Bucharest and studied with Tiberiu Olah at the Bucharest Conservatory in Bucharest from 1970–1975. In 1991, she continued her studies with Theo Loevendie in Amsterdam. In 1991 she also took a position as a professor at the National University of Music, and has served several times as a guest lecturer in Darmstadt, Germany and the Gaudeamus Composers Workshop in Amsterdam. Her music has been commissioned and performed internationally in Europe, Asia and the Americas. She is a member of the Romanian Composers Union.

In 1986, Rotaru published an article with Liviu Comes on the counterpoint techniques of Johann Sebastian Bach and Giovanni Pierluigi da Palestrina in Editura Muzicala. She is professor of harmony at the Bucharest Conservatory, where she has taught since 1990.

Her music appears on labels such as Stradivarius, Nova Musica, and Maguelone Music. Her daughter is the composer Diana Rotaru.

== Prizes and awards ==
- Seven prizes from the Romanian Composers Union (1981, 1986, 1989, 1990, 1994, 1997, 2001)
- Prize of the Romanian Academy of Arts and Sciences (1986)
- First Prize in the GEDOK Competition in Mannheim (1994, for Symphony II).

== Selected works ==
Besides orchestral and chamber works, Rotaru also composers choral and instructional pieces. Selected works include:

- Concerto for clarinet and orchestra, 1984
- Symphony I for large orchestra, 1985
- Métabole II for clarinet and orchestra, 2001
- Sonata for cello, 1978
- String Quartet No. 1, 1981
- Trias for mezzo-soprano, flute, piano, 1999
- The Crossroads of the Poppies for piano, 1980
- Sonatina for piano 1981

A number of recordings of Rotaru's music are available, including:

- Symphony II. Ludovic Bács/Radio Bucharest Orchestra (Editura Muzicala: EM 007)
- Over time. Yoshikazu Iwamoto, shakuhachi; Pierre-Yves Artaud, bass flute (Editura Muzicala: EM 1002)
- Concerto, ‘Seven Levels to the Sky’. Daniel Kientzy, saxophones; Emil Simon/Cluj-Napoca Philharmonic (Nova Musica: NMCD 5105)
