= Egon Kenton =

Hungarian-American composer (1891–1987)

Egon Francis Kenton
- Born: Egon Ferenc Kornstein; May 22, 1891; Nagyszalonta, Austro-Hungarian Empire
- Died: December 3, 1987 (aged 96); Paris, France
- Education: National Royal Hungarian Academy of Music; New York University (MA)
- Occupations: Violist; violinist; composer; musicologist; music librarian
- Employers: CBS Symphony Orchestra; Iowa State University; Peabody College; University of Connecticut; Mannes School of Music

Egon Francis Kenton (born Egon Ferenc Kornstein; May 22, 1891 – December 3, 1987) was a Hungarian and American musicologist, violist, music librarian, and educator born in the Transylvanian village of Nagyszalonta, Austro-Hungarian Empire (now Salonta, Romania) on May 22, 1891 and died in Paris on December 3, 1987.

Kenton began studying viola and violin at the Franz Liszt Academy of Music (known at the time as the National Royal Hungarian Academy of Music) in 1905 and graduated in 1911. Upon graduation he played in the Waldbauer-Kerpely String Quartet, known simply at the time as the Hungarian Quartet, or as Kenton remarked, "the old one—the first Hungarian quartet." Kenton's tenure with this group led to encounters and friendships with some of the most significant composers of the twentieth century.

The group performed Claude Debussy's Quartet in Budapest with the composer in attendance, who was so impressed that he arranged for them to perform the work again in Paris. On his trip to Paris, Kenton became well-acquainted with Debussy and his family, having recounted instances of the French composer's penchant for sarcasm. Of a performance by a well-known Hungarian pianist, Debussy commented, "'I myself can't go tonight unfortunately. I have to go to the Cercle National to listen to my fossil-colleague.' We looked at him with questioning eyes. He went on: 'Camille Saint-Saëns.'"

In addition to his contact with Debussy, his time in the quartet led to a friendship with Béla Bartók. Kenton recommended the Waldbauer-Kerpely Quartet to Bartók, who struggled to find a group with the technical ability needed to perform his first quartet. After their successful performance of the piece, Bartók dedicated his second quartet to Kenton's group.

A personal friend of Edgard Varèse, Kenton was invited by the French composer to the home of Ferruccio Busoni for an intimate salon performance of Pierrot lunaire conducted by the composer Arnold Schoenberg himself. Kenton recalled that, "Schoenberg, timid and a little awkward, started toward the players, but Busoni, handsome and imposing, was already there, congratulating them. Then Schoenberg, screwing up his clever monkey face in a wry smile, turned to Varèse and said: 'And now he's distributing the decorations.'"

Kenton also played a key role in exonerating Hungarian composer Ernő von Dohnányi, with whom Kenton had worked closely on many occasions. Dohnányi, upon immigration to the U.S., was under intense investigation by the American government (and besmirched in news media) after an alleged allegiance to the Nazi party. Testimonies by Jewish musicians such as Kenton in fact revealed a history of heroic assistance of Jewish musicians by Dohnányi.

After four years of military service—and three injuries—Kenton returned to the quartet, touring Europe until 1923. Kenton left the quartet to immigrate to the U.S., where he established himself as a performer, private instructor, and chamber coach. He was a member of the CBS Symphony Orchestra from 1931 to 1937.

He began a second career in academia, earning the M.A. in musicology at New York University in 1947. He subsequently held teaching positions at Iowa State University and Peabody College, and joined the faculty of the University of Connecticut in 1950. A pioneering historical musicologist, Kenton's Life and Works of Giovanni Gabrieli was the first scholarly publication on Gabrieli in the English language. Kenton published extensively in seven languages and received numerous research grants to travel to Venice.

At UConn, Kenton taught courses in musicology, directed the Symphony Orchestra, and hosted a talk show on WHUS Radio. Kenton's courses typically focused on twentieth century topics informed by his life experience. As a teacher, Kenton's approach was informed by his previous career as a performer. He felt strongly that his students were "not only interested in the externals of music, but also the background and forces involved." As music director of the UConn Symphony Orchestra, Kenton believed the ensemble serves a dual purpose: "providing a cultural atmosphere for the students" and "providing a medium whereby student instrumentalists may use their musical ability in a group effort."

Upon his retirement from UConn, Kenton pursued a third career path in music librarianship. He served as head librarian at the Mannes School of Music from 1961 to 1971, transforming the school's collections into a respected music library. He was an active member of the Music Library Association and published frequently in the group's journal Notes, providing insight on newly released critical editions for music librarians developing their collections.

Personal Life

Kenton was born Egon Kornstein, but changed his name after immigrating to New York with his family. The name "Kenton" was chosen from a license plate from Kenton County in Kentucky. The anglicanized name stemmed from a desire to assimilate into American society, and the need for the "K" to match the monogrammed family heirlooms. His wife's name was Ida Weiss, and his children's names were John and Peter Kenton.
