= Salonta =

Salonta Nagyszalonta, Szalonta
- Municipality
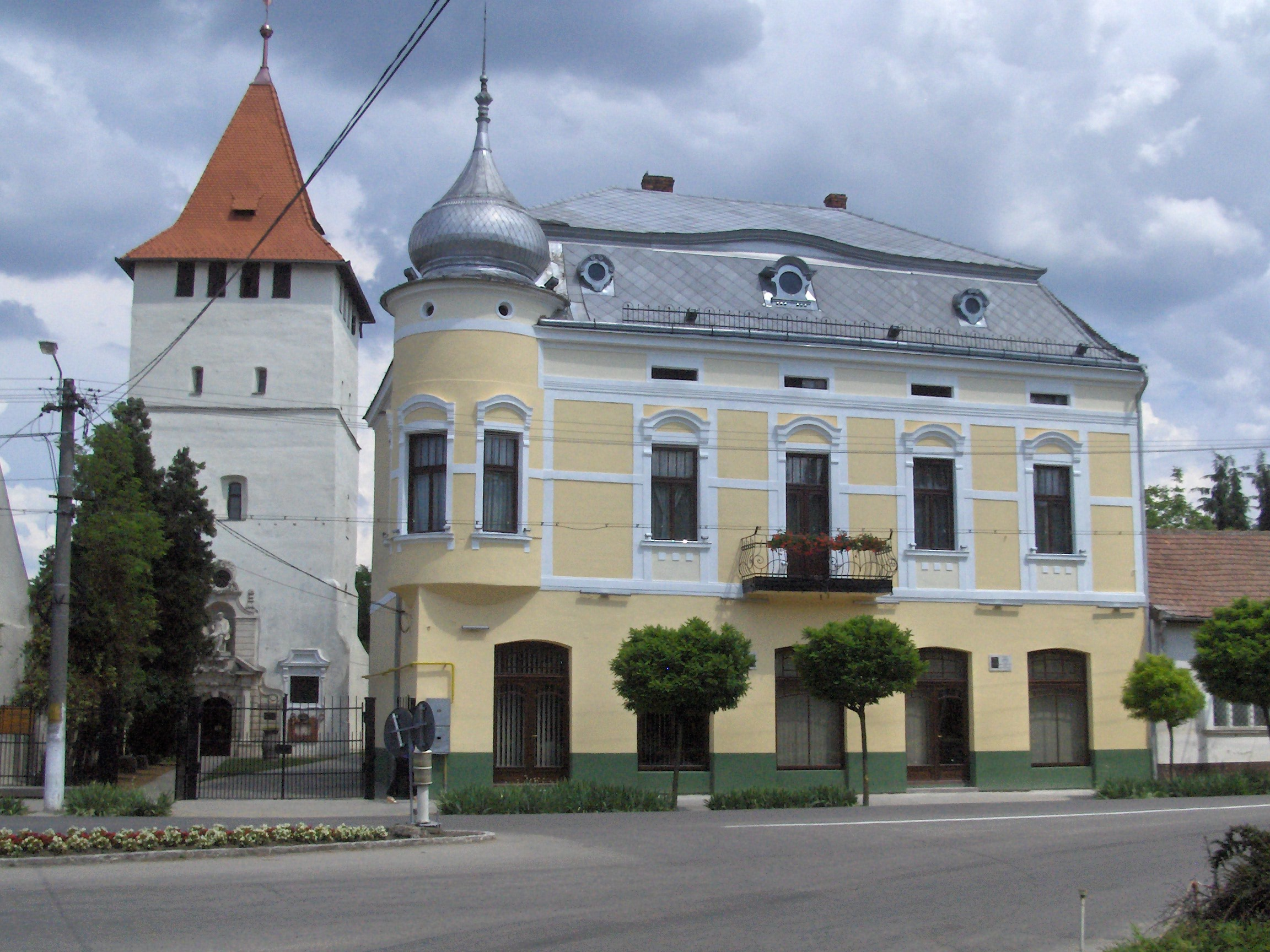
- Ciunt Tower (Csonka Torony) and Arany Palace (Arany Palota)

- Flag Coat of arms

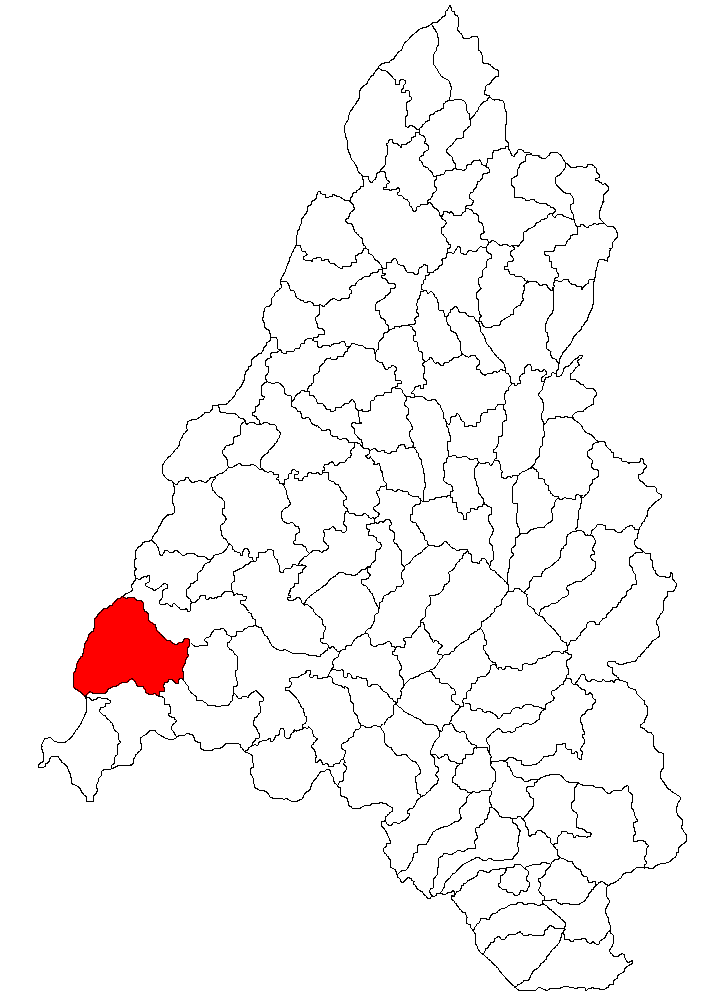
- Location within Bihor County

- Location in Romania
- Coordinates: 46°48′N 21°39′E
- Country: Romania
- County: Bihor

Government
  - Mayor (2024–2028): László Török (UDMR)
- Area: 170.04 km^{2} (65.65 sq mi)
- Elevation: 90 m (300 ft)
- Population (2021-12-01): 15,792
  - Density: 92.872/km^{2} (240.54/sq mi)
- Time zone: UTC+02:00 (EET)
  - Summer (DST): UTC+03:00 (EEST)
- Postal code: 415500
- Area code: (+40) 02 59
- Vehicle reg.: BH
- Website: salonta.net

Salonta (Romanian pronunciation: [saˈlonta]; Hungarian: Nagyszalonta [ˈnɒcsɒlontɒ], colloquially Szalonta; German: Großsalontha) is a city in Bihor County, in the geographical region of Crișana, north-western Romania, near the Hungarian border.

== Population ==
Historical population
Year	Pop.	±%
1880	10,403	—
1890	12,650	+21.6%
1900	14,107	+11.5%
1910	15,514	+10.0%
1930	15,297	−1.4%
1941	15,251	−0.3%
1948	14,447	−5.3%
1956	16,276	+12.7%
1966	17,754	+9.1%
1977	19,746	+11.2%
1992	20,660	+4.6%
2002	20,006	−3.2%
2011	17,042	−14.8%
2021	15,792	−7.3%
Source: Census data

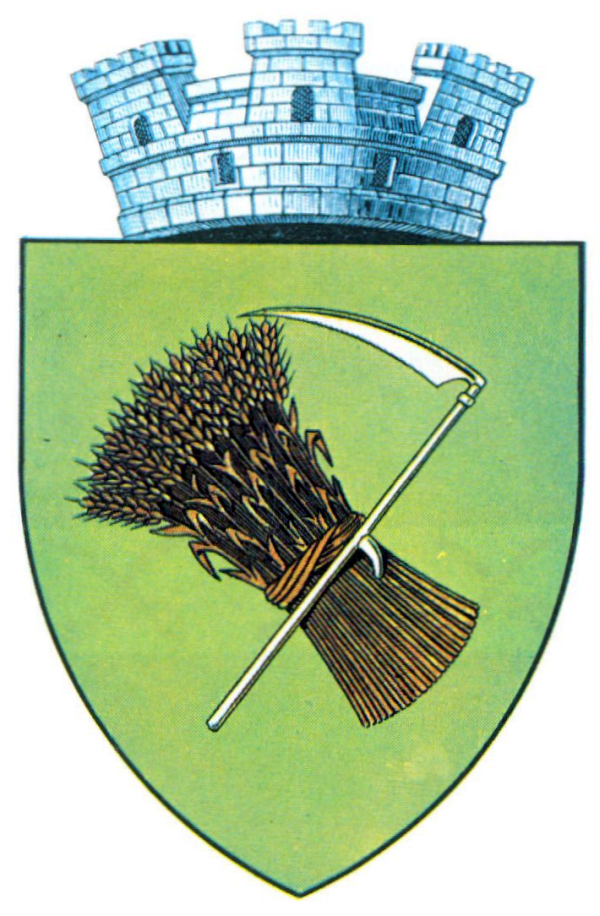
Interwar coat of arms of Salonta.

According to the 2021 census, Salonta has a population of 15,792. At the census from 2011, the city had a population of 17,042, made up of Hungarians (58.1%), Romanians (38.83%), Romani (2.4%), Slovaks (0.4%), and others (0.5%). In terms of religion, at the 2002 census, 51.12% were Reformed (Calvinist), 36.46% Romanian Orthodox, 6.56% Roman Catholic and 5.86% was split between Baptists, Romanian Greek-Catholic, Pentecostals, and other faiths.

== History ==
The city, a part of the Kingdom of Hungary, was first documented in 1214 under the name of Zolonta and in 1332 a Papal document used the name Zalanta. The Hungarian spelling Szalonta was used since 1587.

Etymologically, the name is probably related with those of other Romanian localities (slavic names) like Slatina, Zlatna, or Slănic, whose Romanian meaning is "Sărata" ("Saline"). It can also be derived from Hungarian szalonna ("bacon"), a term having the same etymological meaning, and in regional context – the name of two contiguous villages are probably related with the types of stock growth in the area: Mădăras, from Hungarian "madar" ("bird"), and Tulca from Hungarian "tulok" ("bullock") – it may refer to the numerous pig growers in its perimeter.

Until the 16th century, it was only a small village of about 300 inhabitants and was on the land of the Toldi family. A bigger city was the fort of Culișer, which was however destroyed by the Ottoman Turks in 1598. Culiser was never rebuilt and Salonta began to have a more important role in the region after 1606, when the prince of Transylvania, Stephan Bocskai settled 300 soldiers here and appropriated land for them. They built their own farms, but had to keep their arms ready to repel an attack by the Turks. 3 June, the day in which the soldiers were settled, is nowadays declared "the day of the city". However, Ottoman Turks captured the town in 1660 and as Salanta, it became the sanjak center of Varat vilayet until 1692.

The 19th century Hungarian poet János Arany was born and lived in Salonta for most of his life. Lajos Zilahy, another noted Hungarian author, was also born in Salonta in 1891. Violist and musicologist Egon Kenton was born there the same year.

After the collapse of Austria-Hungary at the end of World War I, and the declaration of the Union of Transylvania with Romania, the Romanian Army took control of Salonta in April 1919, during the Hungarian–Romanian War. The city officially became part of the territory ceded to the Kingdom of Romania in June 1920 under the terms of the Treaty of Trianon. During the interwar period, it became the seat of plasa Salonta, in Bihor County. In August 1940, under the auspices of Nazi Germany, which imposed the Second Vienna Award, Hungary retook the territory of Northern Transylvania (which included Salonta) from Romania. Towards the end of World War II, however, the city was taken back from Hungarian and German troops by Romanian and Soviet forces in October 1944, during the initial stages of the Battle of Debrecen. The territory of Northern Transylvania remained under Soviet military administration until 9 March 1945, after which it became again part of Romania. The Paris Peace Treaties of 1947 reaffirmed the Trianon border. Following the administrative reform of 1950, the town became the seat of Salonta Raion within Bihor Region (renamed Oradea Region in 1952 and Crișana Region in 1960). In 1968, the old territorial division into județe was reinstituted, and the city reverted to being part of Bihor County.

== Natives ==
- János Arany (1817–1882), Hungarian poet, writer, translator, and journalist
- Iosif Ardeleanu (1909–1988), communist activist and bureaucrat
- Miklós Bonczos (1897–1971), Hungarian politician
- Gabriel Buta (born 2002), footballer
- Yasin Hamed (born 1999), footballer
- Egon Kenton (1891–1987), Hungarian and American musicologist
- Elemér Kocsis (1910–1981), footballer
- Dorin Mihuț (born 1982), footballer
- Alexandru Moghioroș (1911–1969), communist activist and politician
- Sergiu Oltean (born 1987), footballer
- Mircea Pavlov (born 1937), chess International Master
- Eugen Rozvan (1878–1938), communist activist, lawyer, and Marxist historian
- Enikő A. Sajti (born 1944), Hungarian historian
- Lajos Sătmăreanu (1944-2025), footballer
- Andra Ursuța (born 1979), Romanian-American sculptor
- Lajos Zilahy (1891−1974), Hungarian novelist and playwright

== Climate and geography ==
Salonta has a continental humid climate, with warm to hot summers and cold to very cold winters, but relatively little snow. The average annual precipitation is 578 mm^{3} (0.0353 cu in). The average January temperature is −2.4 °C (27.7 °F) and in July it is 20.7 °C (69.3 °F) (averages for low and high). It is located in the plains west of the Apuseni Carpathians at an elevation between 91 and 100 m (299 and 328 ft).

== Economy ==
Salonta is famous nationwide for its Salam de Salonta sausage products that have been produced since the 1970s. Most of the state-owned factories built during the communist period went into bankruptcy since 1989. During the 2000s however, there has been a considerable foreign direct investment in small factories and assembly plants – particularly in the clothing industry.

In 2008, Inteva Products LLC – a large multinational – started production at its Salonta facility, the only one the company has in Romania and one in only five throughout Central and Eastern Europe. Inteva produces cables and latches and other car parts at the Salonta facility.

The Salonta gas field (which started production in 2010) is located near the city.

== Trivia ==
The city of Salonta hosted the 2006 Romanian National Gliders Championship (Campionat naţional de aeromodelism) and its team, Metalul Salonta, has won the championship several times.

== Politics ==
The Salonta Municipal Council, elected in the 2012 local government elections, is made up of 17 councillors, with the following party composition:

Party	Seats in 2012	Current Council
Democratic Alliance of Hungarians in Romania	13	
Social Liberal Union	4	

== Sports ==
Basketball: C.S.S. "Teodor Neș" Salonta

Tengo Salonta is Salonta's football tennis team. The club has achieved success at the national level and also won the Football Tennis Club World Cup in 2017, defeating a Czech club from Karlovy Vary, the host city, 3–1 in the final.

Football is also a sport with a long tradition in the town situated near the Hungarian border. Olimpia Salonta is the team of Salonta, being founded in 1911, the club played mostly at Liga III and Liga IV, with 31 seasons played in the third league of the Romanian football league system.

For 10 years, between 2003 and 2013, in Salonta existed another football club, Liberty Salonta, a club with a strong academy at national level that promoted many interesting players over time, even managing a promotion to Liga I in 2006, but the club sold its place to UTA Arad and never played at the highest level of the Romanian football.

== International relations ==
=== Twin towns – sister cities ===
Salonta is twinned with:

- Csepel, Hungary
- Hajdúböszörmény, Hungary
- Nagykőrös, Hungary
- Rimavská Sobota, Slovakia
- Sarkad, Hungary (since 2001)
- Túrkeve, Hungary (since 1994)
- Derecske, Hungary
- Békéscsaba, Hungary

== Image gallery ==
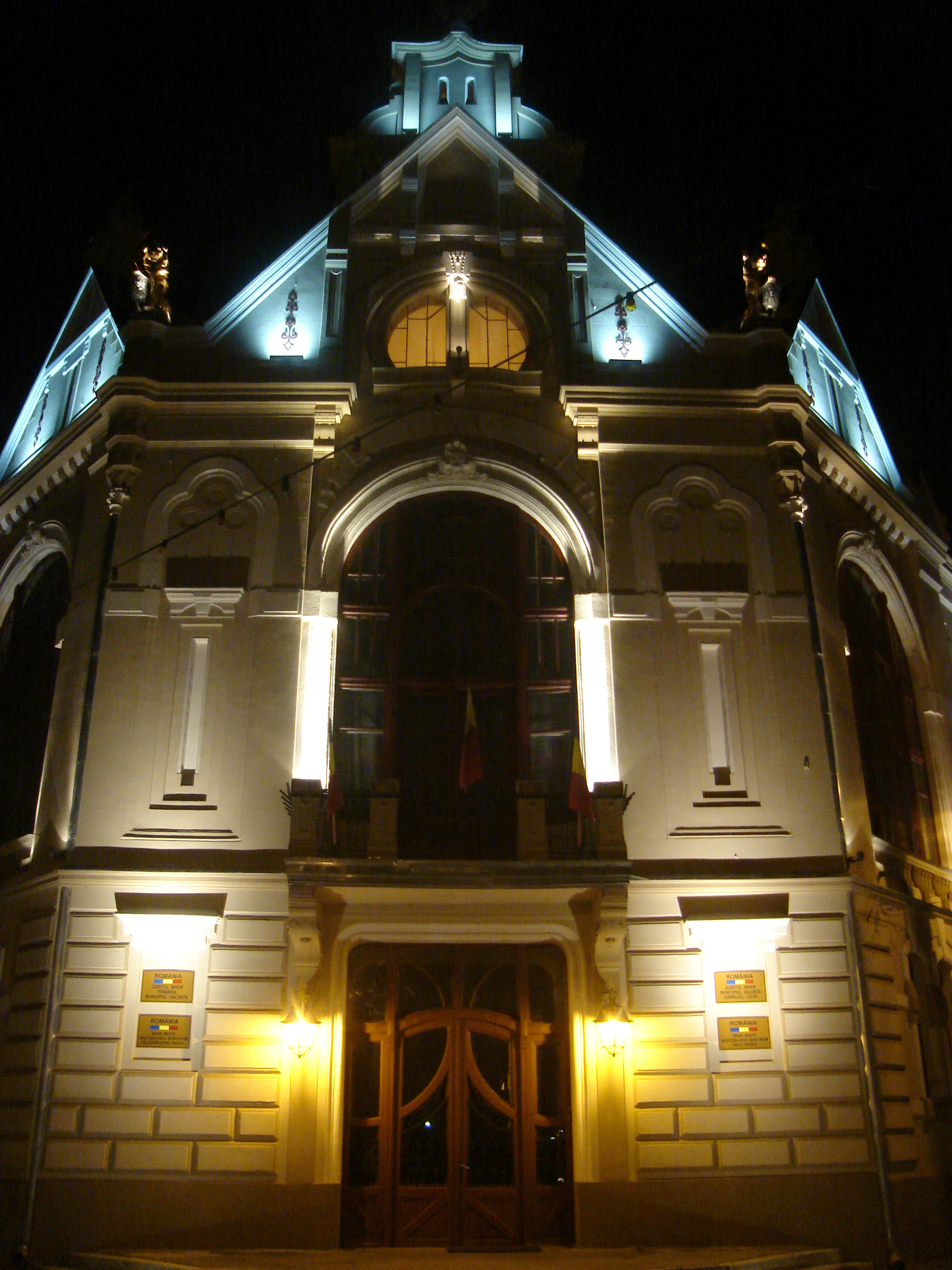
The front of the Salonta City Hall

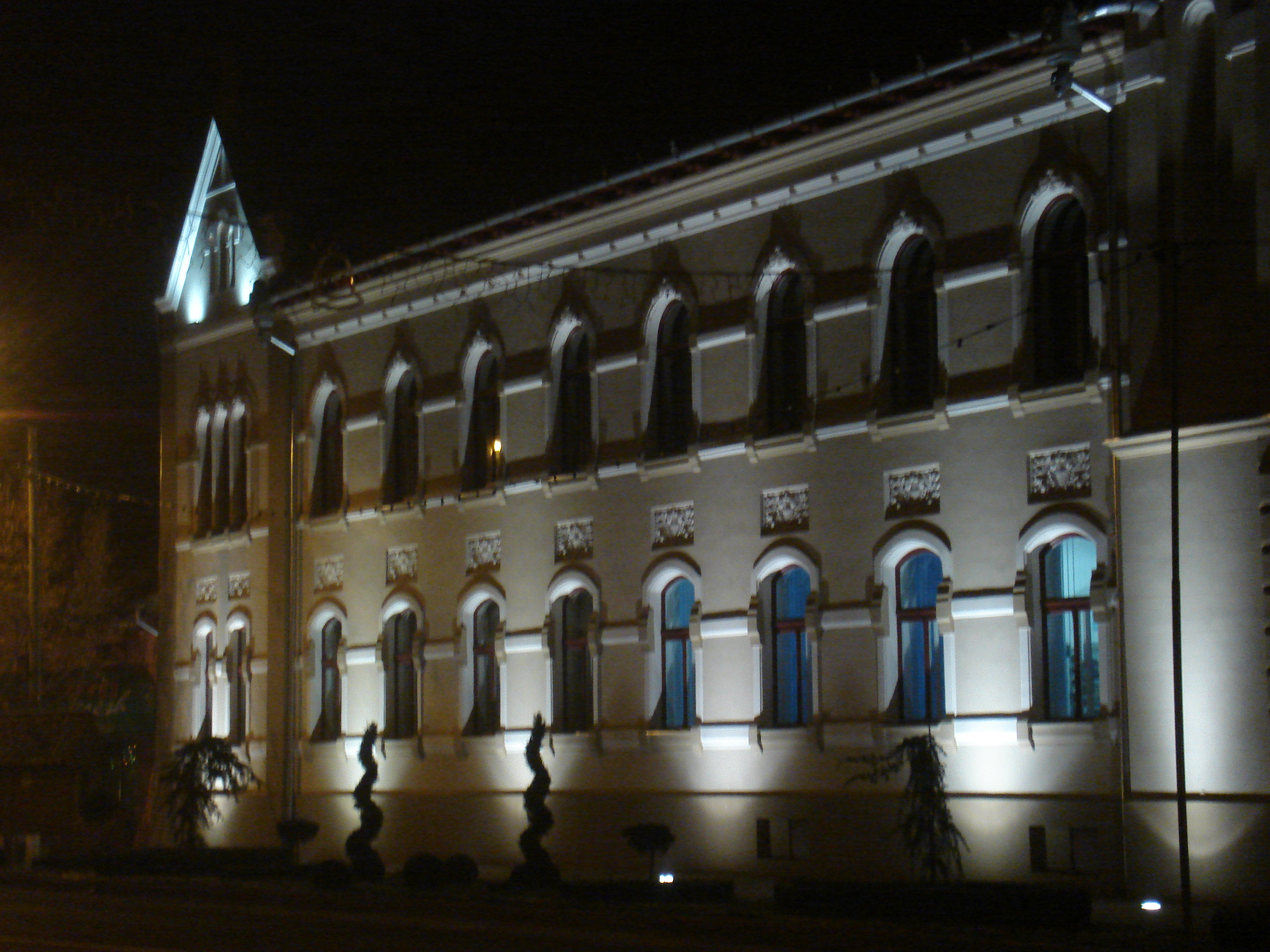
City Hall (Városháza/Primăria)

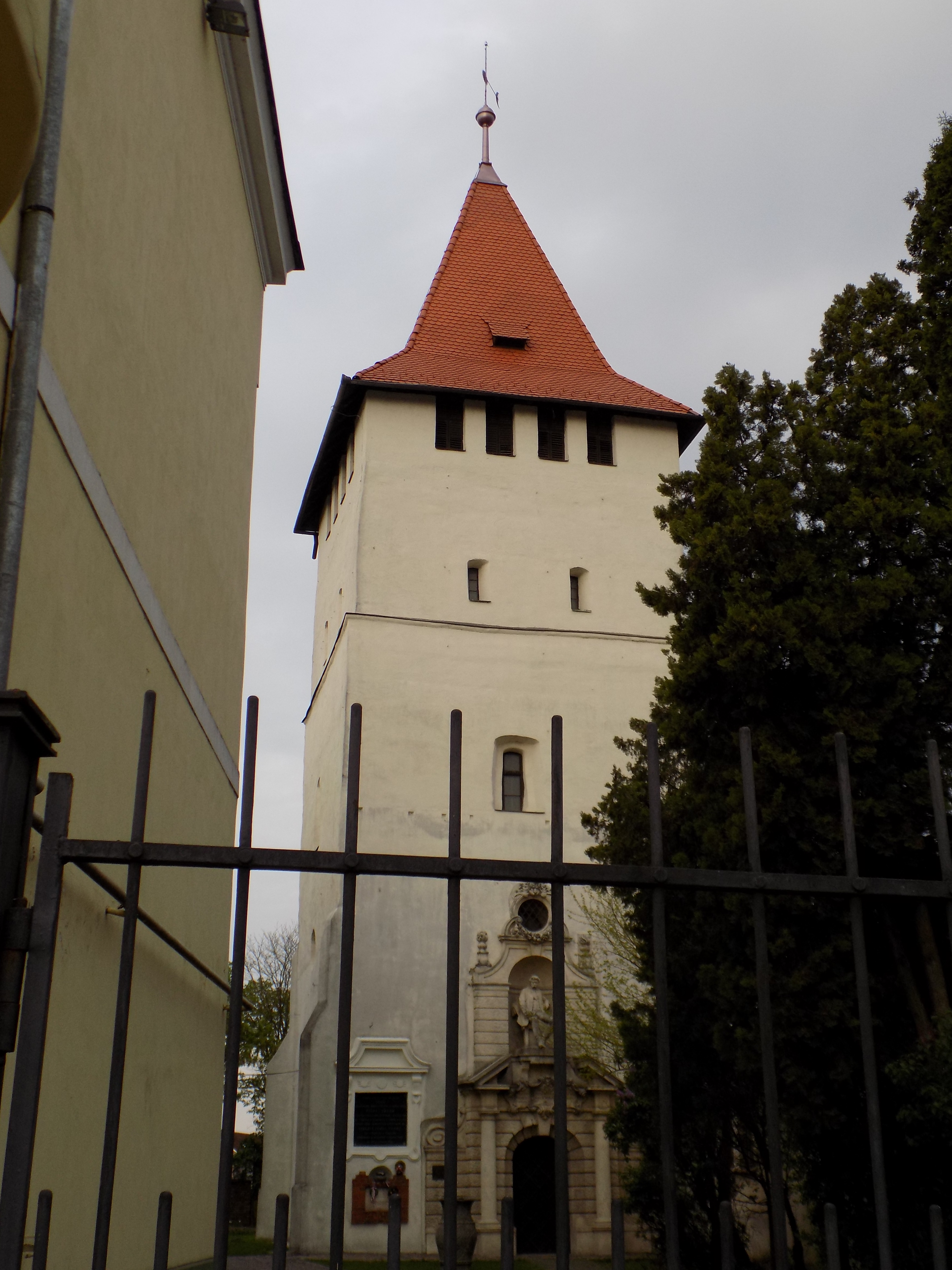
Ciunt Tower (Csonka Torony/Turnul Ciunt)

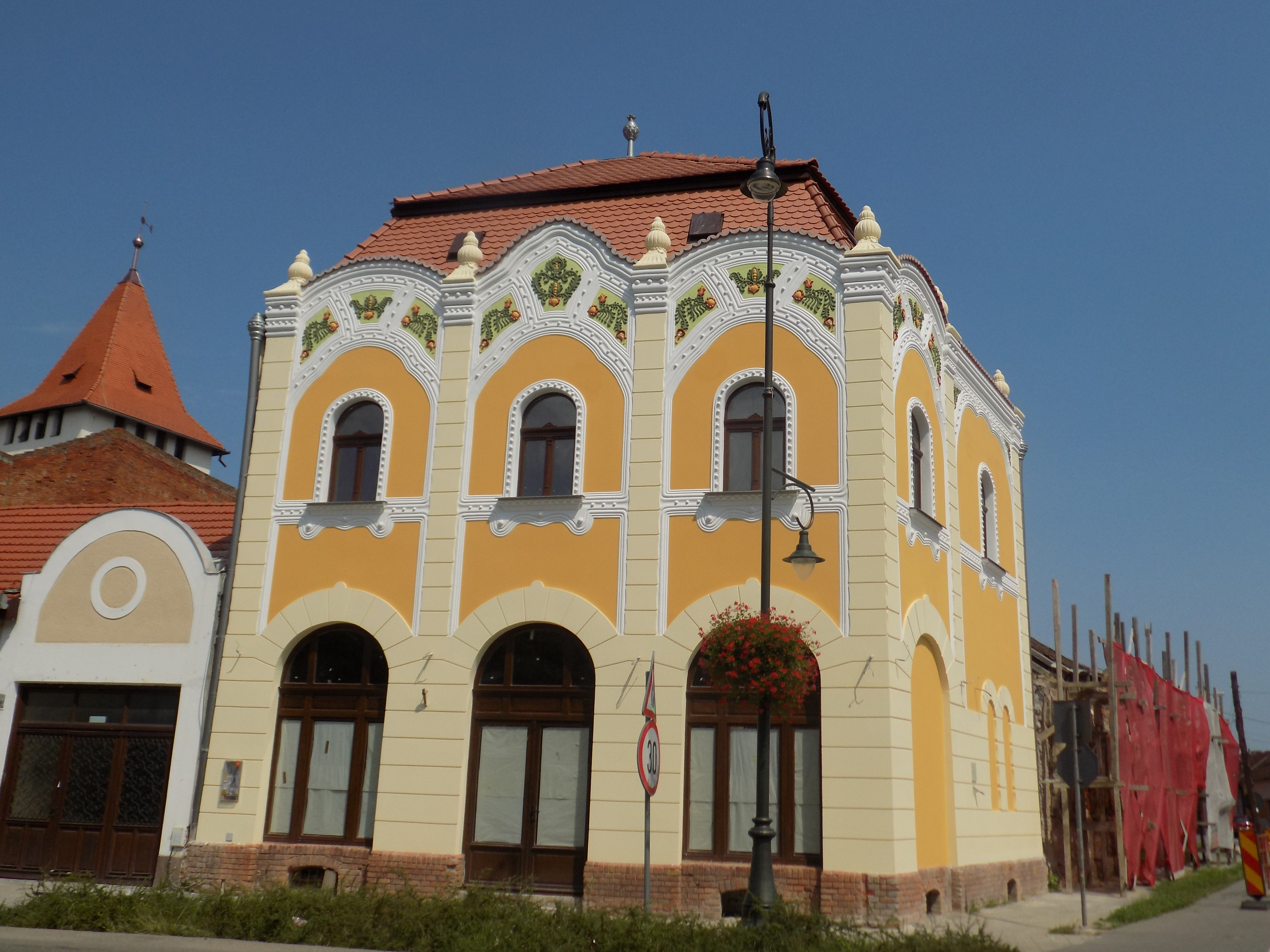
Róth House

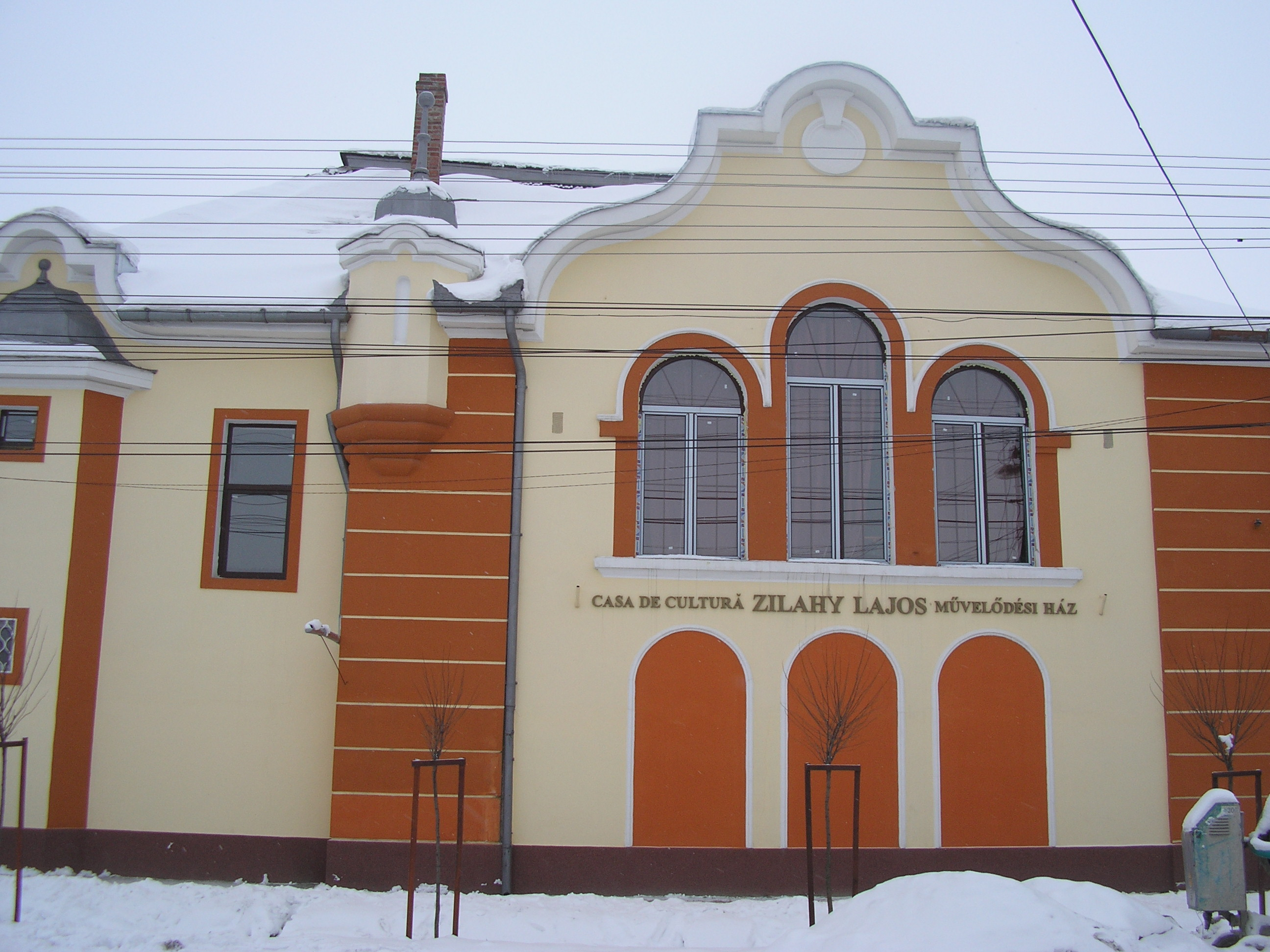
House of Culture (Kultúr Ház/Casa de Cultură)

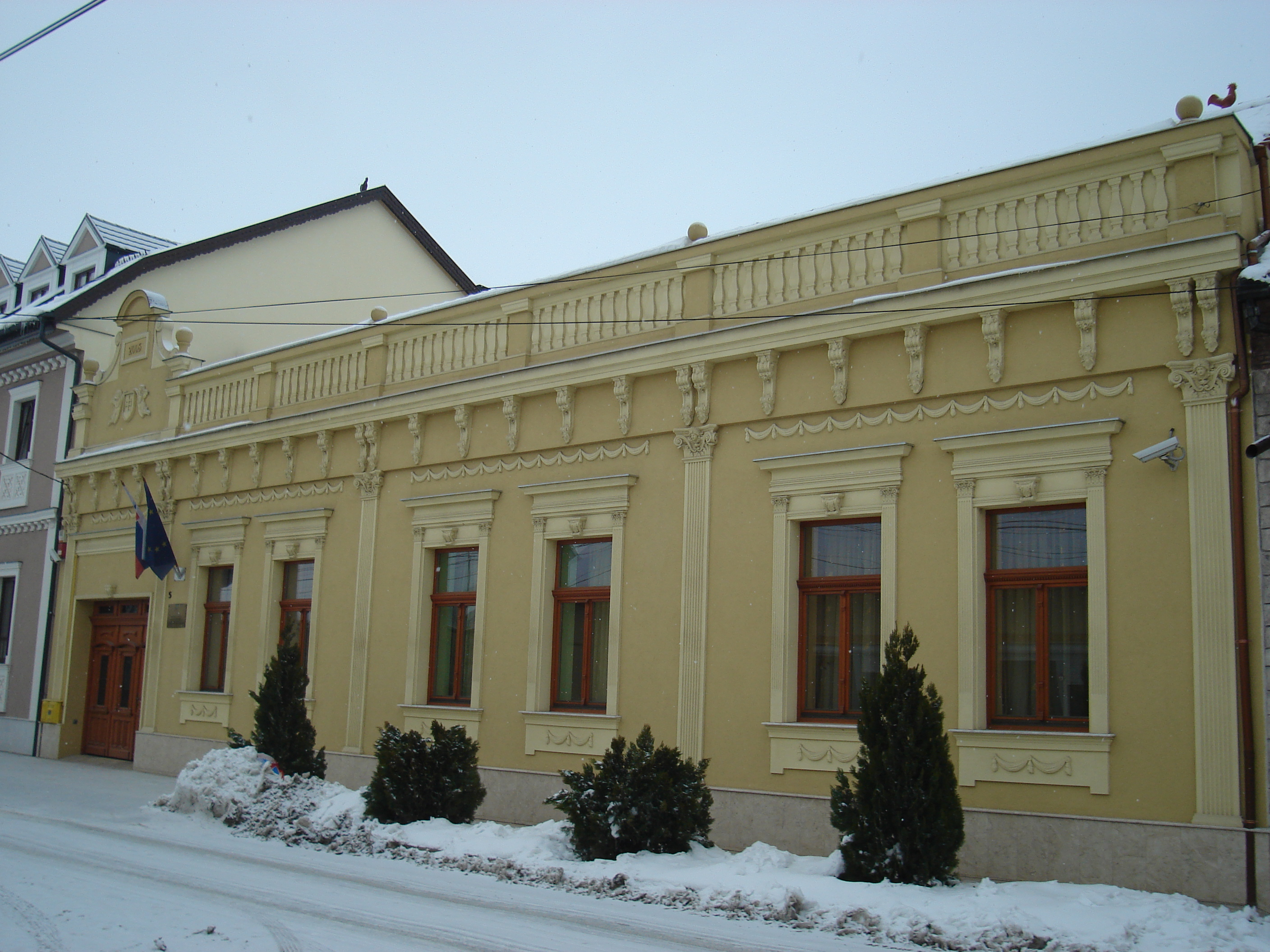
Consulate of Slovakia (Szlovák Konzulátus/Consulatul Slovac)

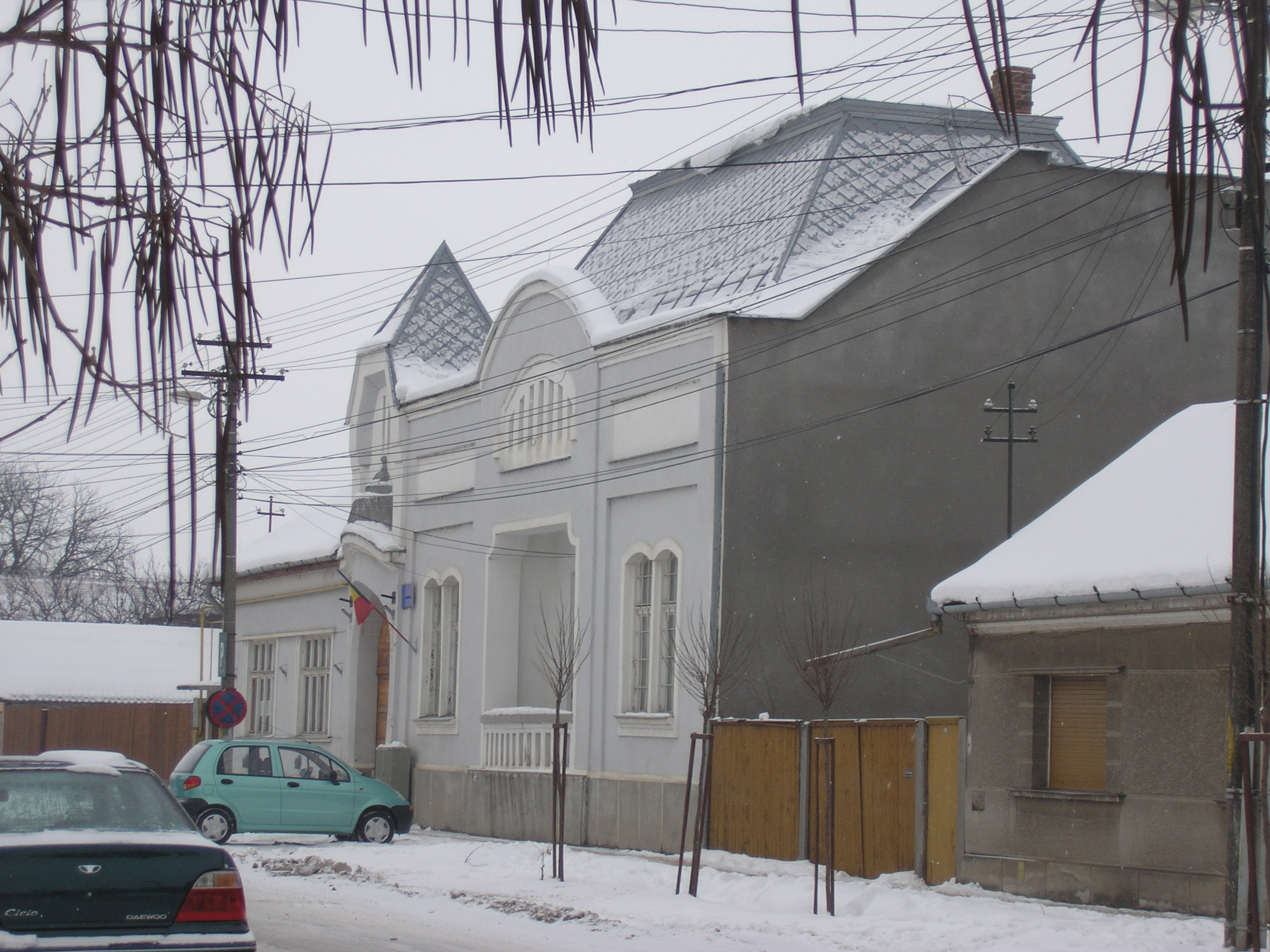
The Court

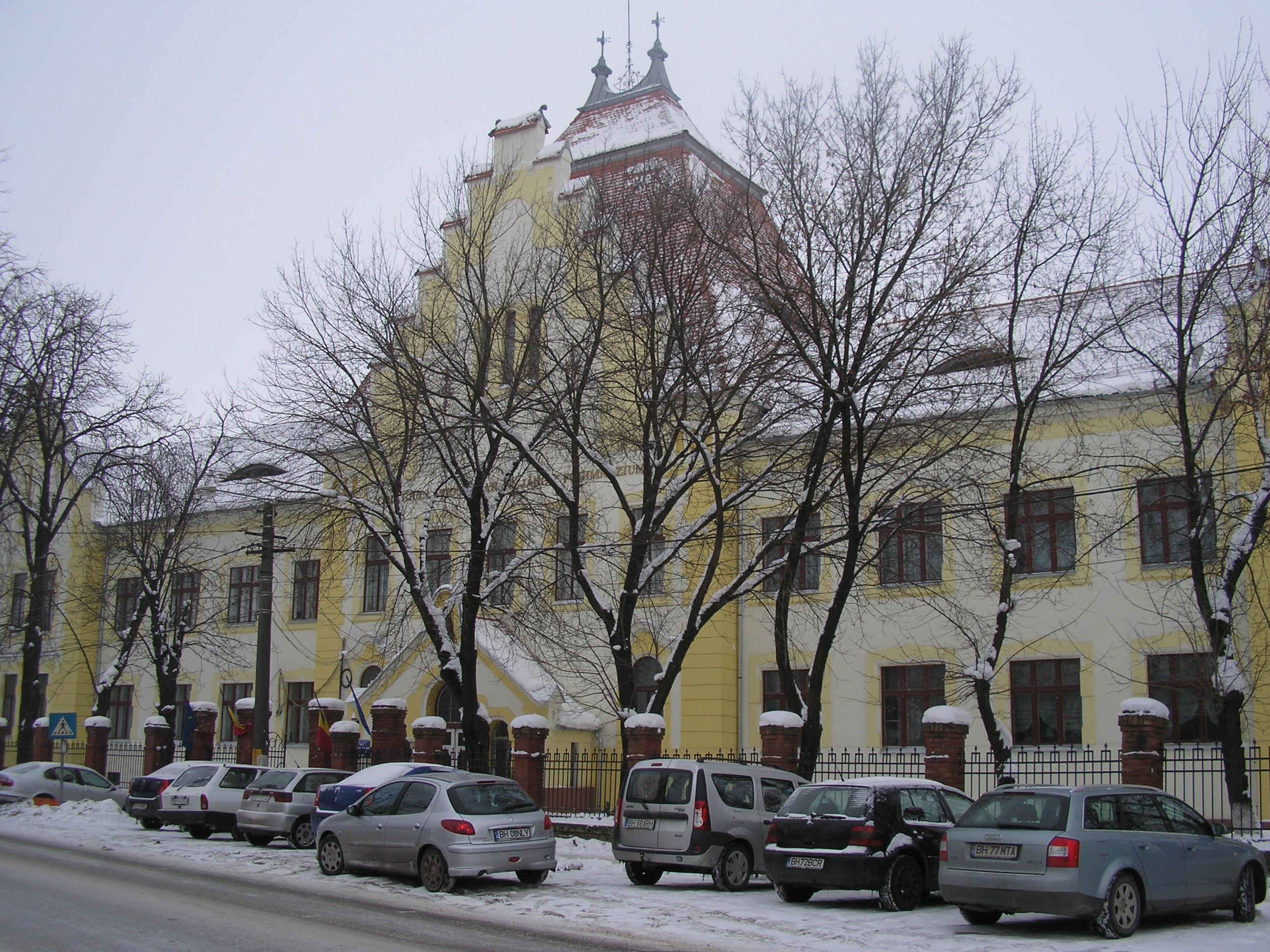
Teodor Neș National College (Teodor Neș Kollégium/Colegiul Națtional Teodor Neș)

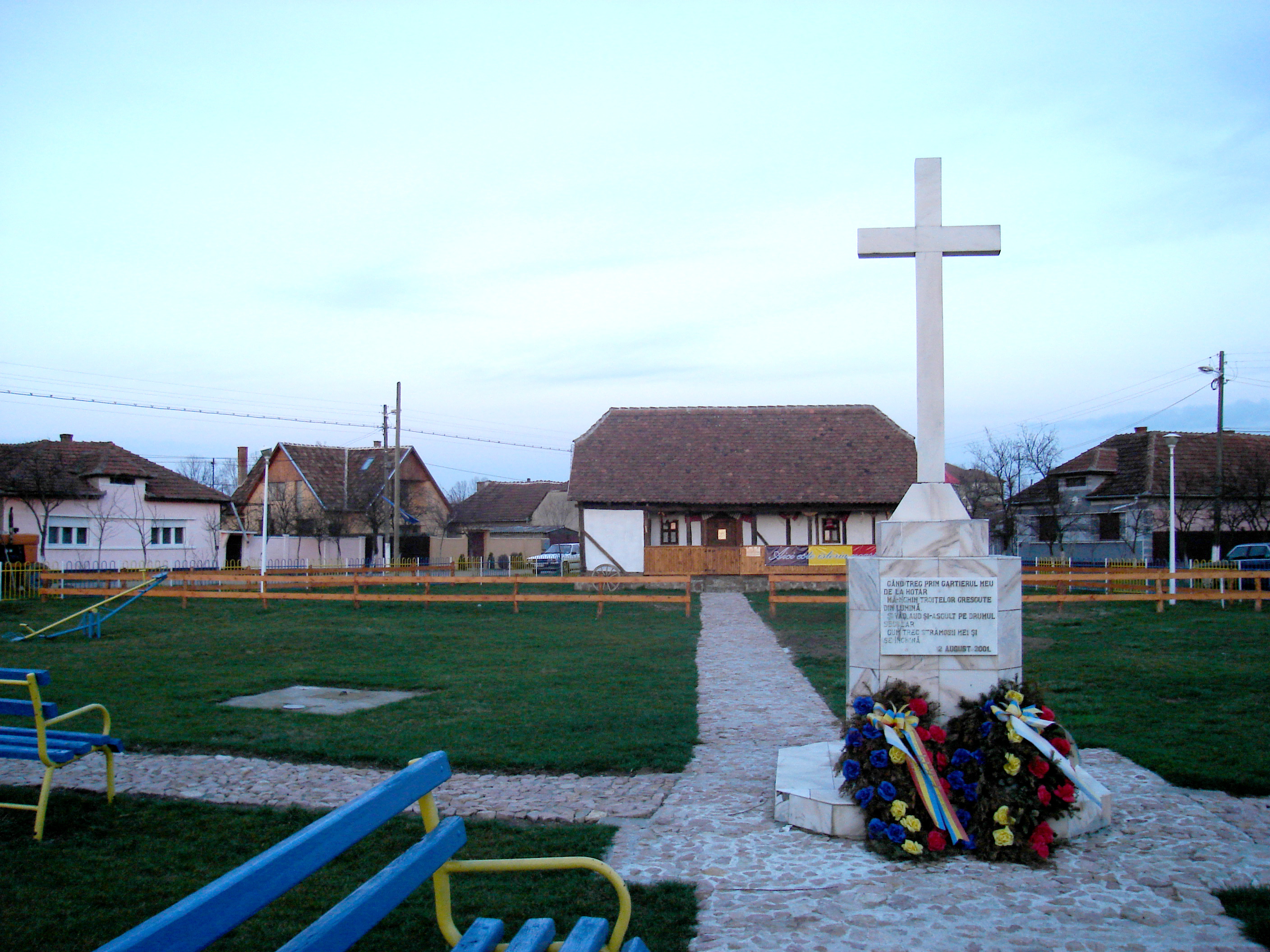
The Peasantry Museum panorama

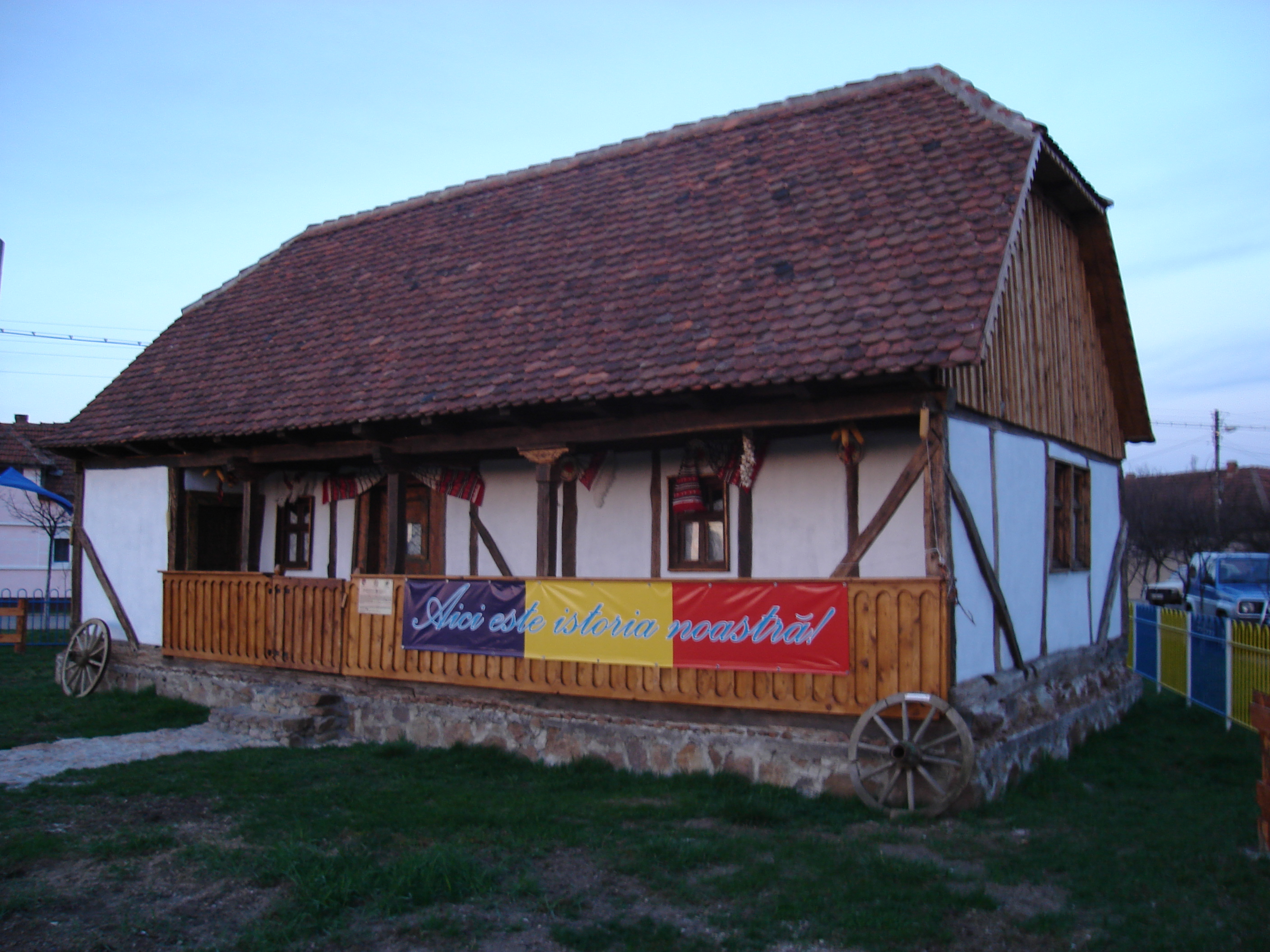
The Peasantry Museum

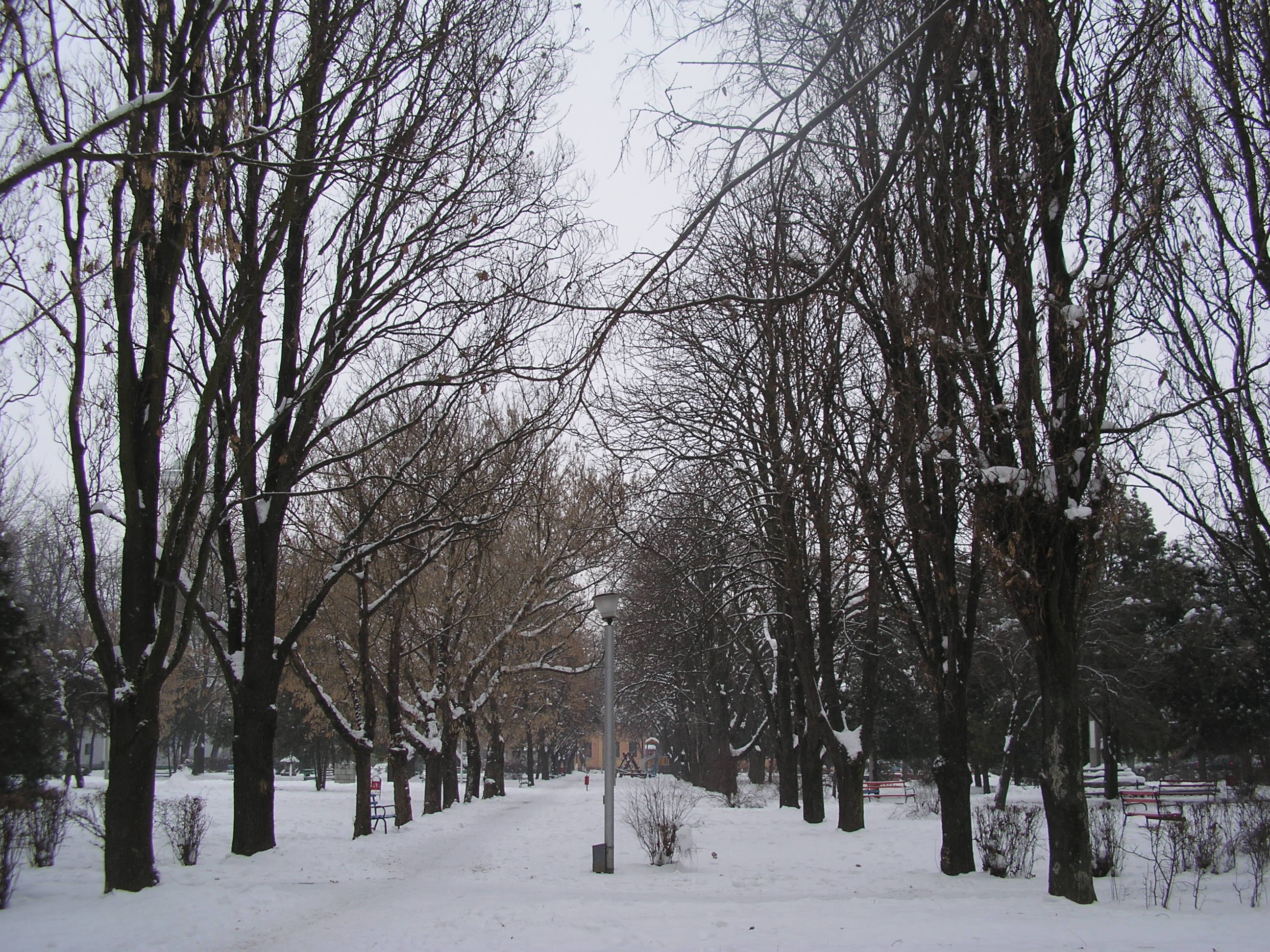
Central Park (Központi Park/Parcul Central)

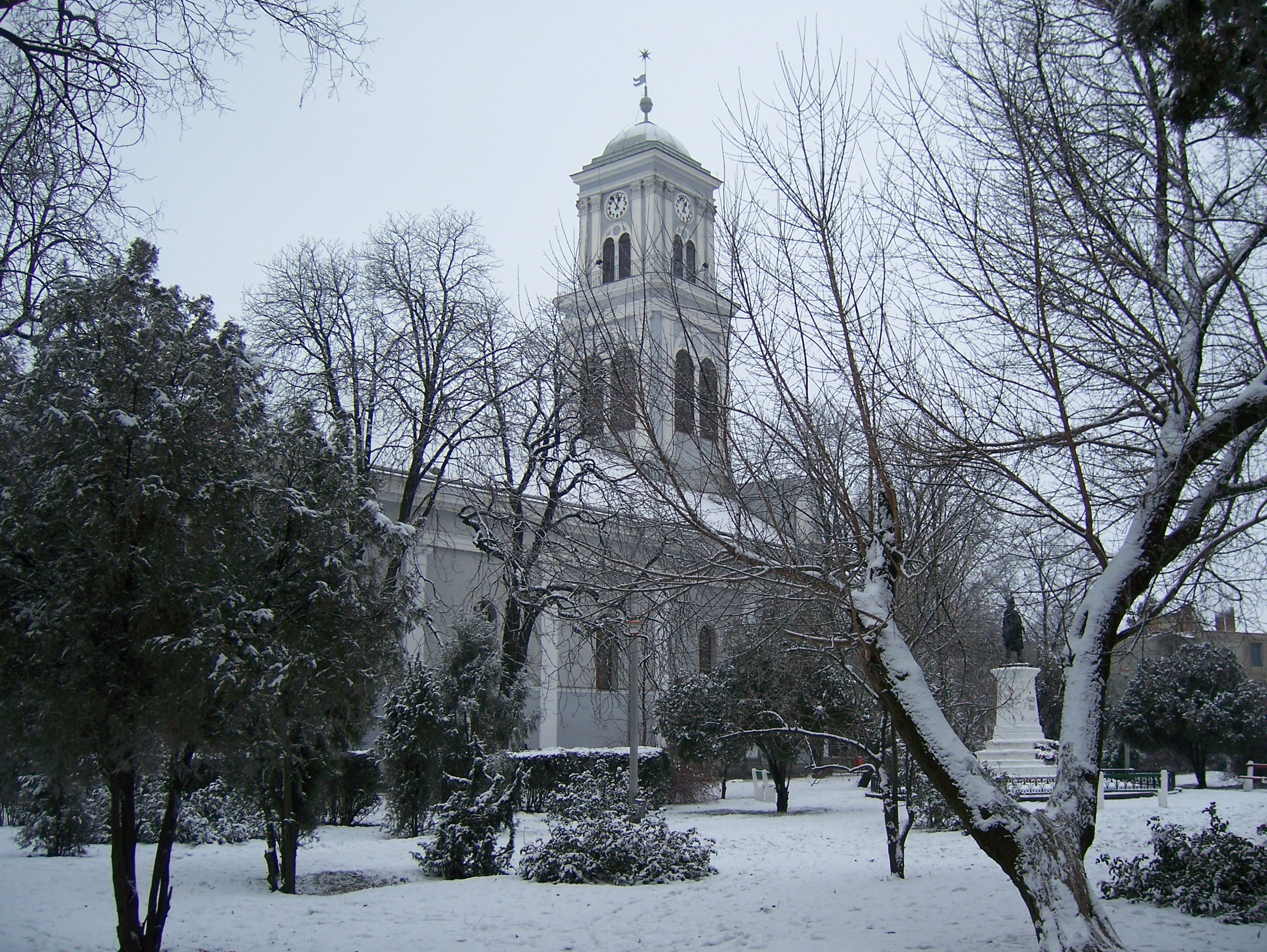
Reformed Cathedral (Református Templom/Templul Reformat)

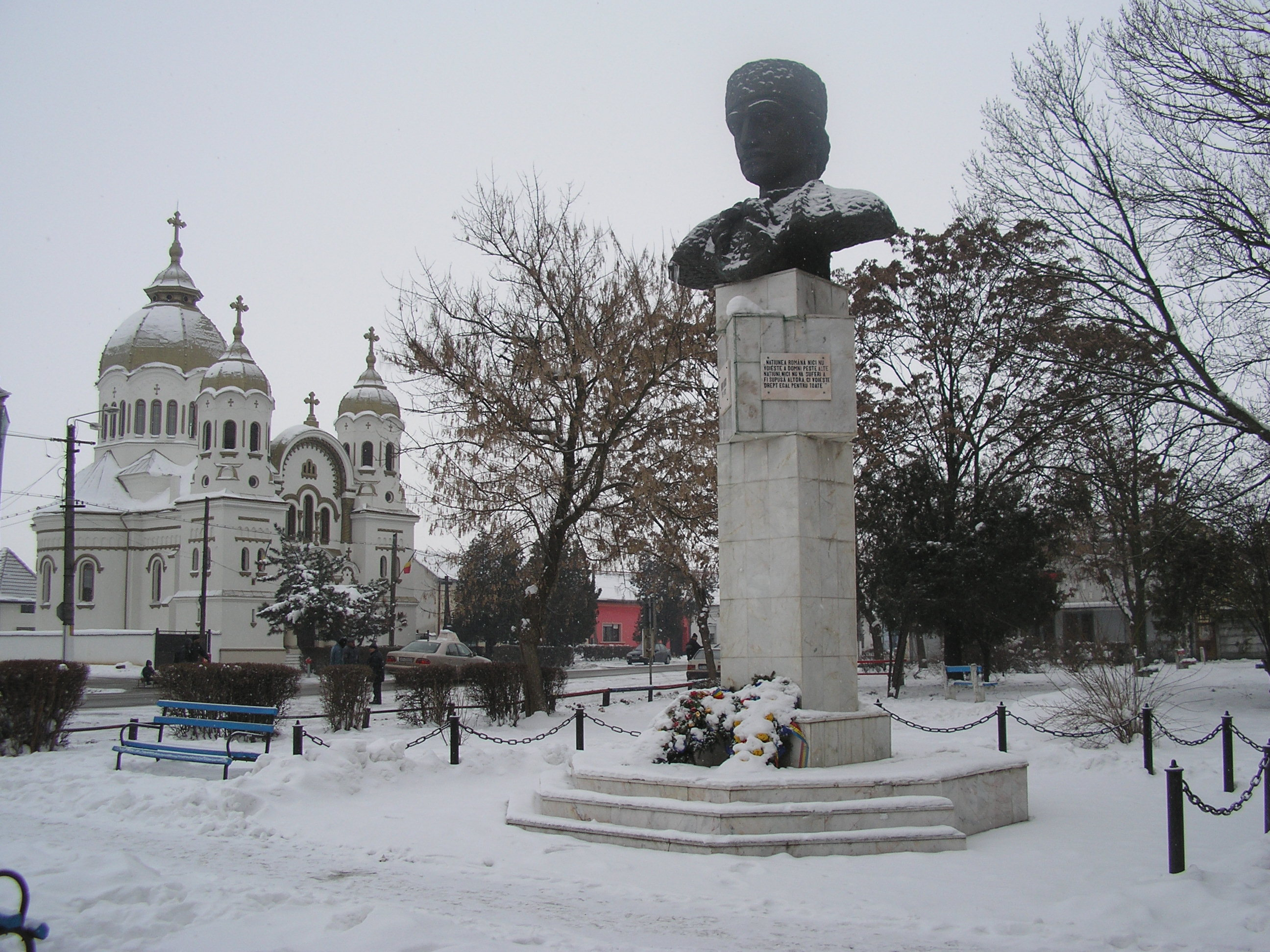
Orthodox Church

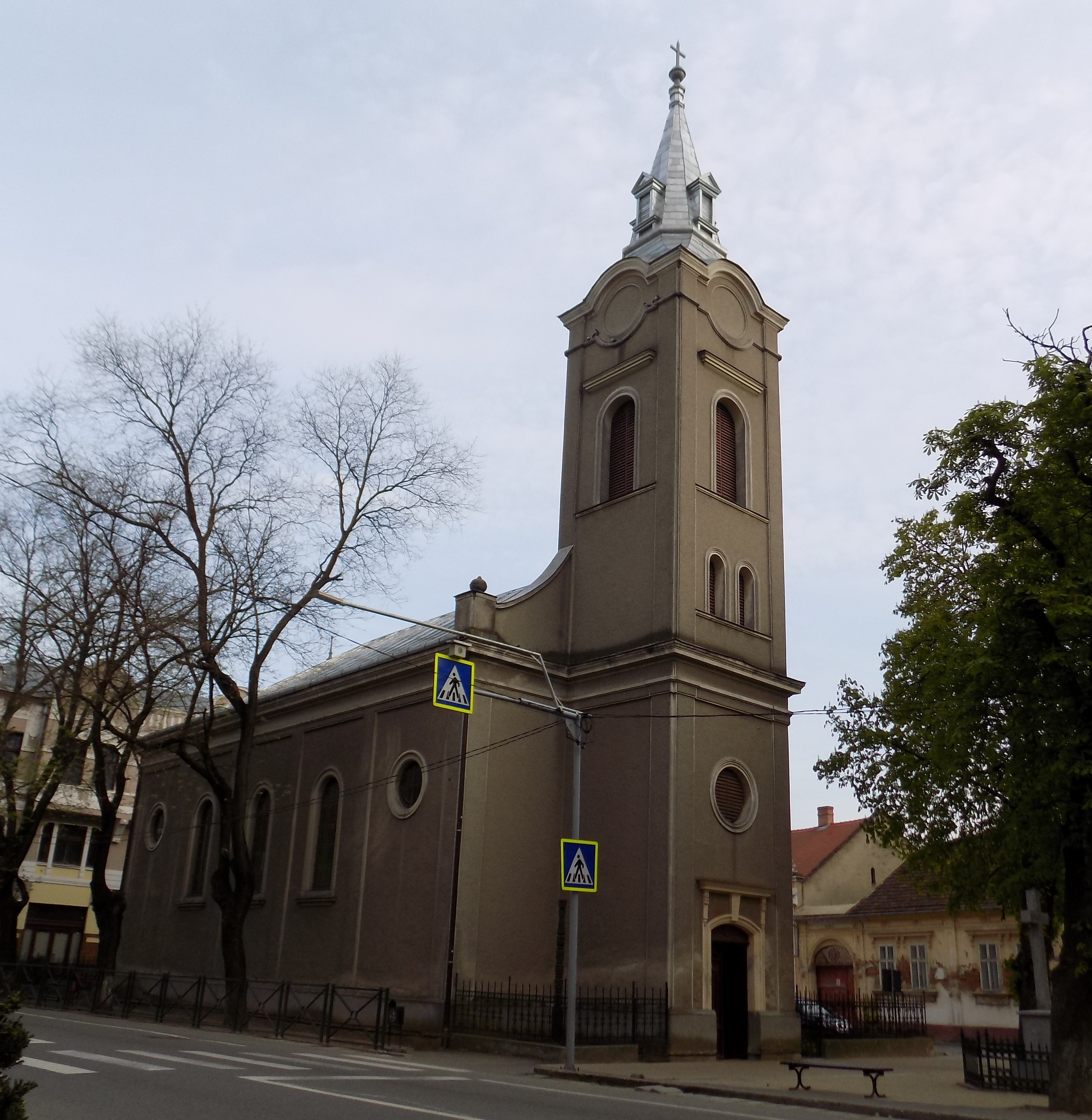
Catholic Church

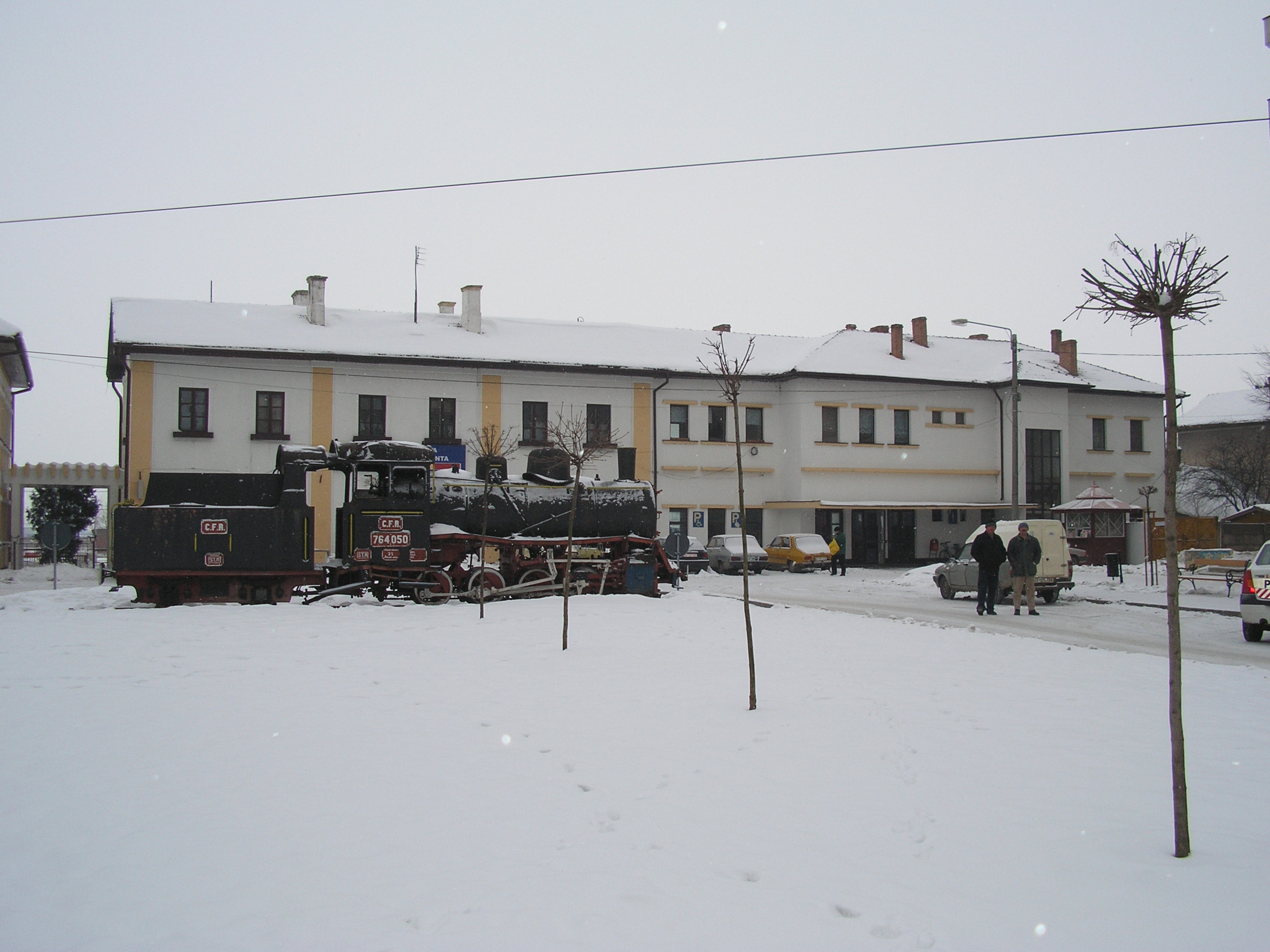
Train monument and the railway station

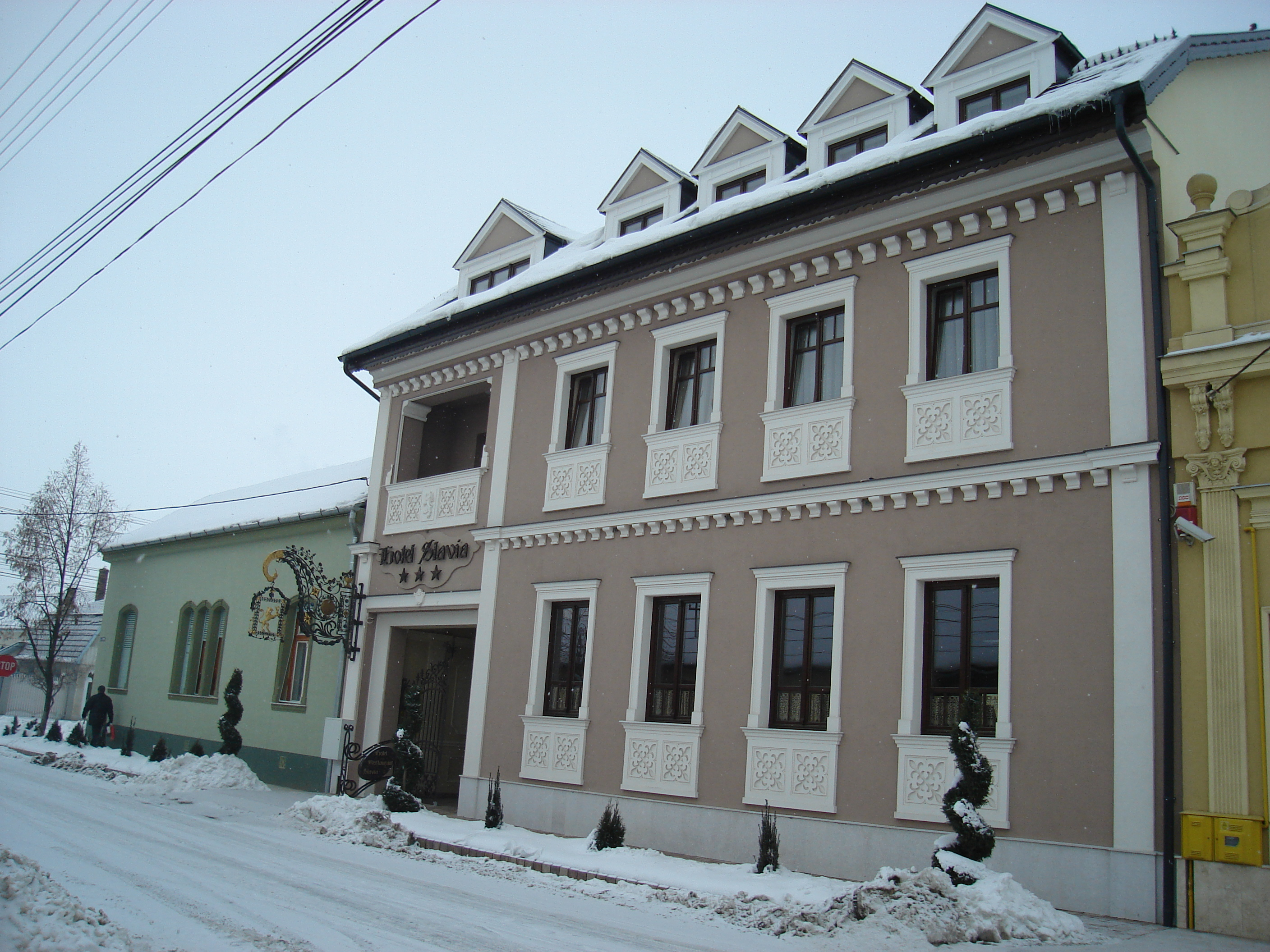
Slavia Hotel

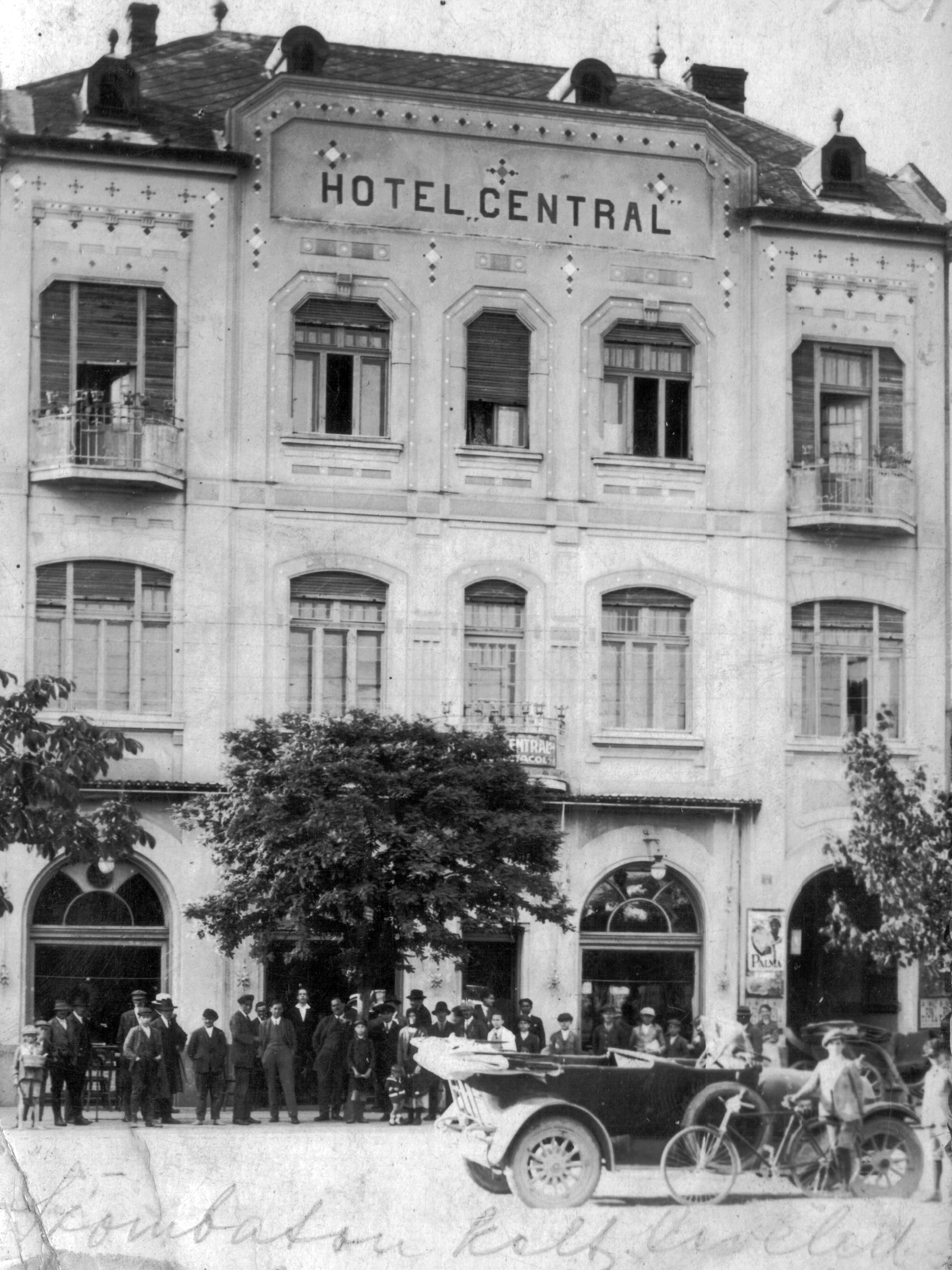
Central Hotel in 1932

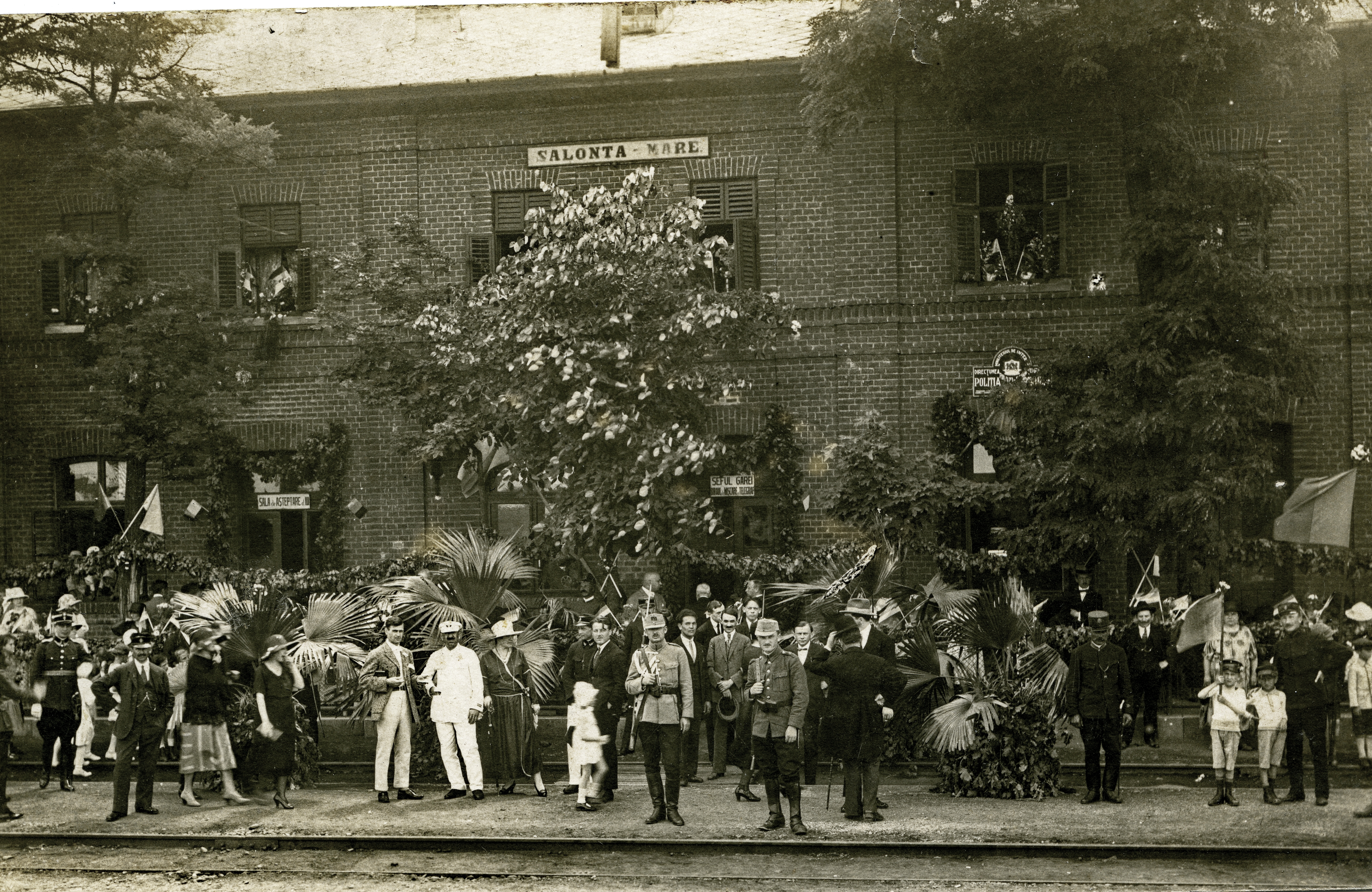
The railway station in 1921

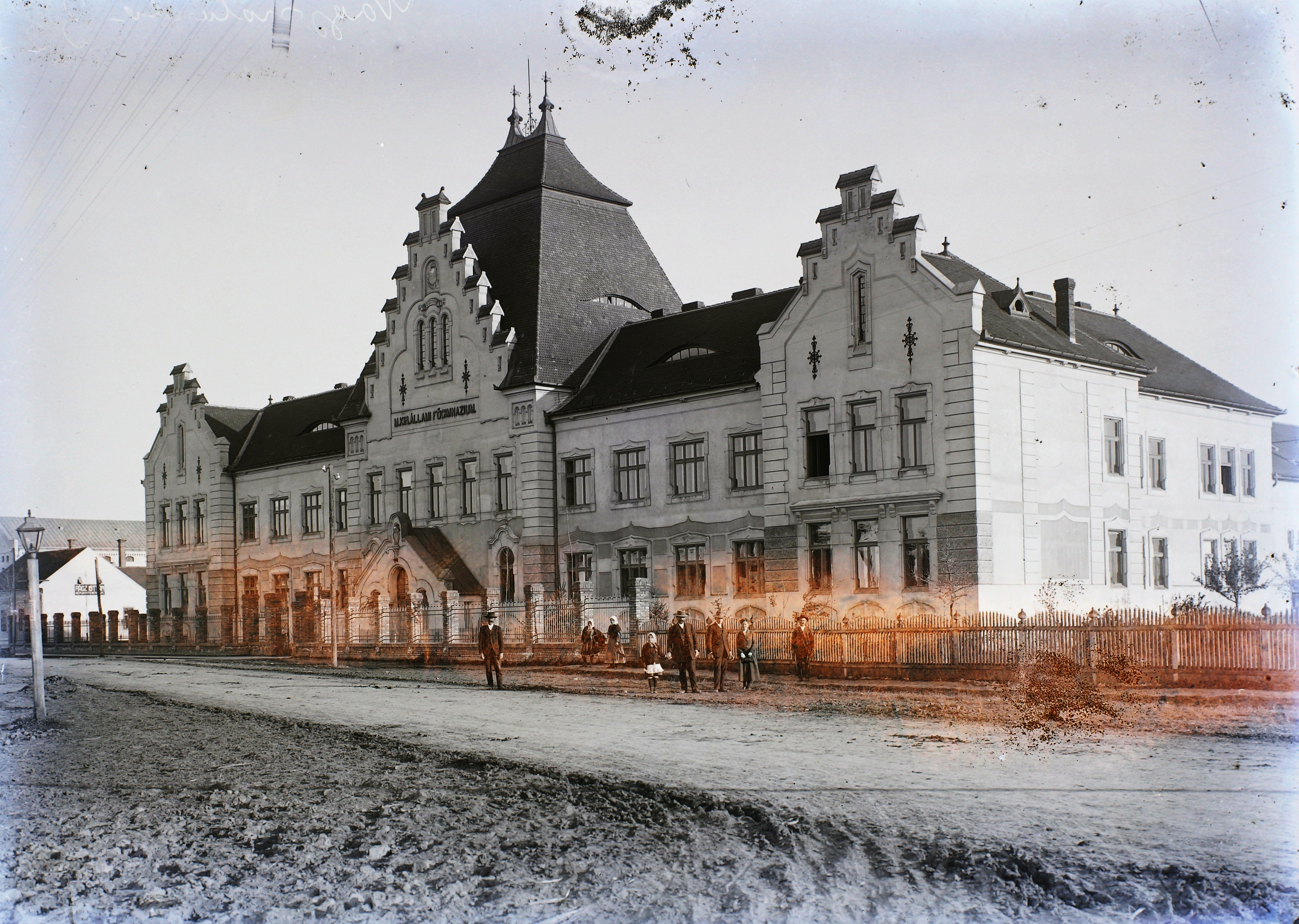
The high school in 1907

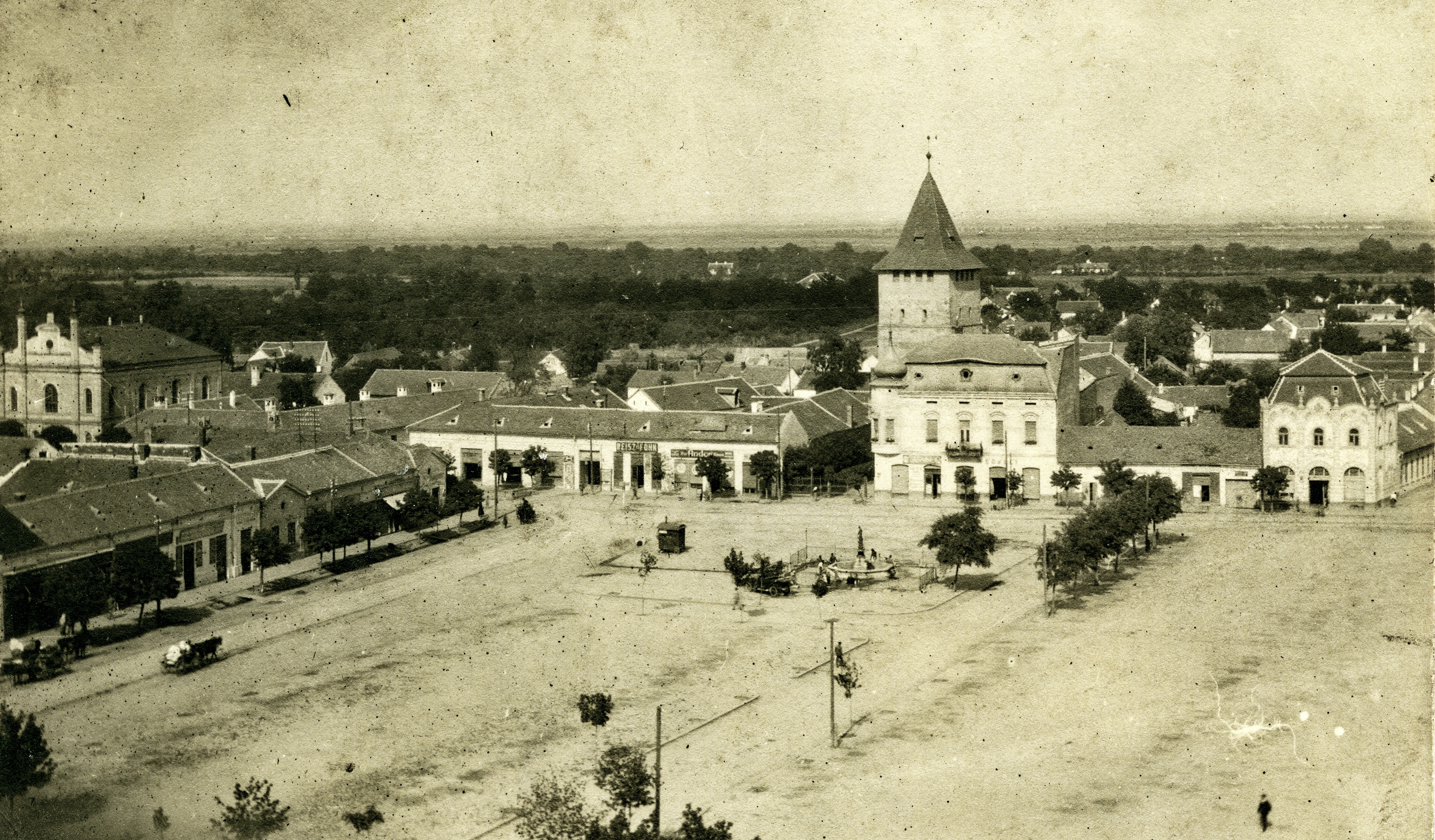
Ciunt Tower and the center of the town in 1917

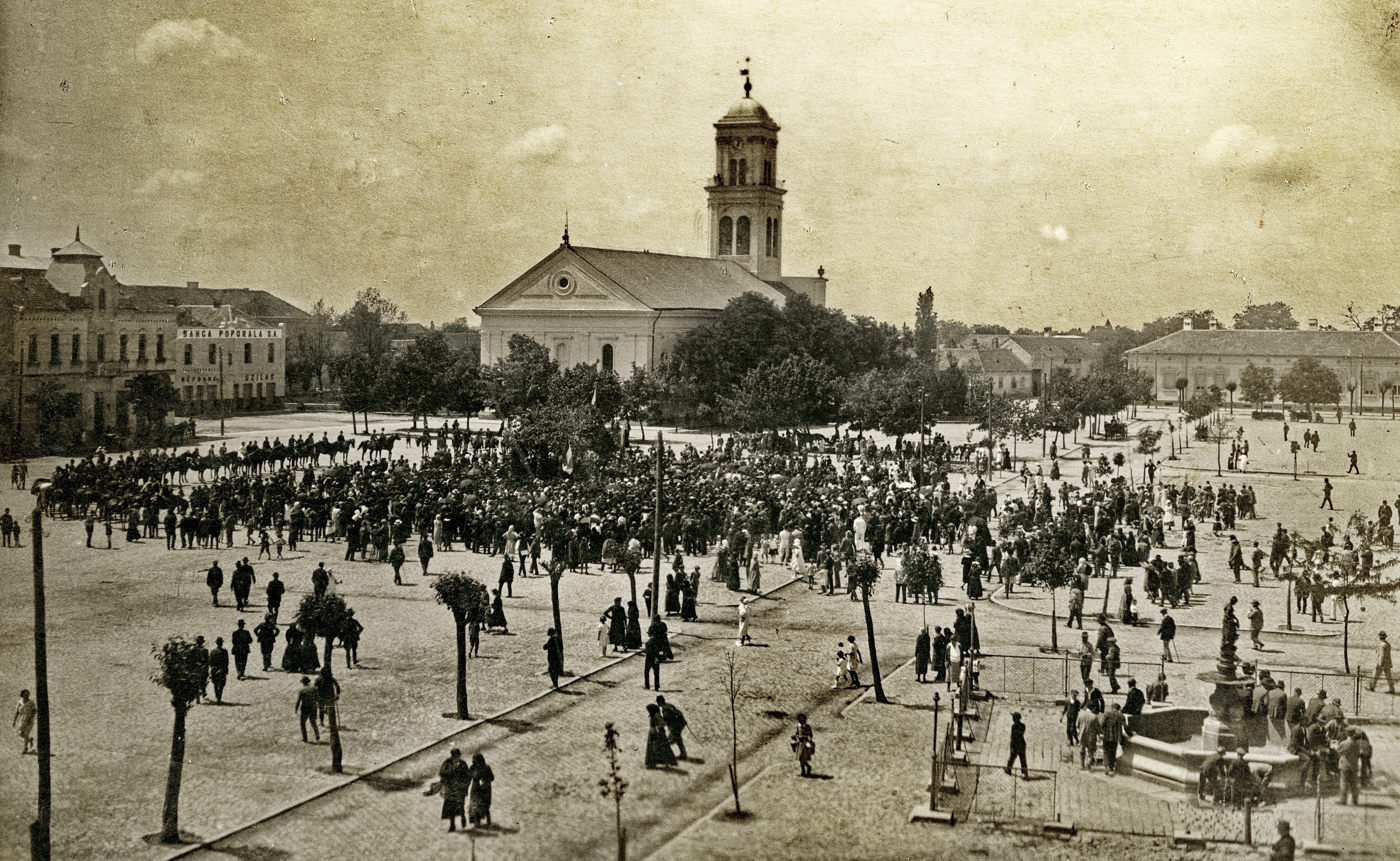
Reformed Cathedral and the center of the town in 1917
