= List of compositions by Nicolae Bretan =

Nicolae Bretan was a twentieth century Romanian composer. This list of compositions by Nicolae Bretan includes his operatic work, lieder, choral music and orchestral works.

== Stage works ==
- Luceafărul (The Evening Star), opera, 1 act (Bretan, after Mihai Eminescu; first performance: Cluj, Romanian Opera, 2 February 1921)
- Golem, opera, 1 act (Bretan, after Illés Kaczér; first performance: Cluj, Hungarian Theatre, 23 December 1924)
- Horia, opera, 3 acts (Bretan, after Ghiță Popp; first performance: Cluj, Romanian Opera, 24 January 1937)
- Arald (Harald), opera, 1 act (Bretan, after Eminescu; first performance: Iași, Romanian Opera, 12 May 1982)
- Eroii de la Rovine (The Heroes of Rovine), opera, 1 act (Bretan, after Eminescu; first performance: Cluj, Romanian Opera, 24 January 1935)
- A Különös Széder-Est (The Mysterious Seder), mystery play (texts from the Haggadah, first performance: Bethesda, Bradley Hills Presbyterian Church, 8 September 1974)

== Lieder ==
Title	Lyricist / source author	Year completed	Place completed
A csucsai kert	Csinszka (Boncza Berta)	1958	Cluj-Napoca
A fiam bölcsőjénel	Endre Ady	1910	Budapest
A Halál rokona	Endre Ady	1949	Cluj-Napoca
A maradandóság városában	Endre Ady	1950	Cluj-Napoca
A murit	Octavian Goga	1921	Cluj-Napoca
A nagy Pénztárnok	Endre Ady	1950	Cluj-Napoca
A Sion-hegy alatt (Am Fuße des Berges Zion)	Endre Ady (German lyrics by Zoltán Franyó)	1952	Cluj-Napoca
A Teremtő jobbján	Sándor Kibédi	1931	Cluj-Napoca
A vén cigány (Der alte Zigeuner)	Mihály Vörösmarty (German lyrics by Bretan)	1921	Cluj-Napoca
Ach, ich sehne mich	Heinrich Heine	1929	Cluj-Napoca
Adio	Nicolae Bretan	1951	Cluj-Napoca
Alti trandafiri	Nicolae Bretan	1931	Cluj-Napoca
Am beut din fântâna trecutului	Emil Isac	1959	Cluj-Napoca
Amen	Dezső Varró	1951	Cluj-Napoca
Atât de fragedă	Mihai Eminescu	1933	Cluj-Napoca
Auf dem Teich	Nikolaus Lenau	1929	Cluj-Napoca
Az is jó	János Giszkalay	1925	Cluj-Napoca
Az Úr érkezése	Endre Ady	1952	Cluj-Napoca
Bei Übersendung eines Straußes	Nikolaus Lenau	1913	Biserica Albă
Berceuse	Nicolae Bretan	undated	unknown
Bitte	Nikolaus Lenau	1904	Năsăud
Când amintirile...	Mihai Eminescu	1920	Cluj-Napoca
Când noi...	Victor Eftimiu	1928	Cluj-Napoca
Când se apropie noaptea	Emil Isac	1959	Cluj-Napoca
Cântec de leagăn	Nicolae Bretan	1946	Cluj-Napoca
Cântecul frunzelor	Ecaterina Pitiș	1907	Hunedoara
Cântecul plugarului	Zaharia Bârsan	1906	Cluj-Napoca
Ce e amorul?	Mihai Eminescu	1921	Cluj-Napoca
Ce te legeni, codrule?	Mihai Eminescu	1920	Cluj-Napoca
Cenușa visărilor	Tudor Arghezi	1937	Oradea, Cluj-Napoca
Chemare	Maria Cunțan	1905	Năsăud, Hunedoara
Chip zîmbitor	anonymous	1900	Năsăud
Crăiasa din poveşti	Mihai Eminescu	1920	Cluj-Napoca
Crizanteme (Krizántémok)	Victor Eftimiu (Hungarian lyrics by Bretan)	1927	Cluj-Napoca
Csárdás	Beleznay	1906	Hunedoara
Cucule, de ce nu vii?	Carolina Bretan	1909	unknown
Das dürre Blatt (Foaia veştedă)	Nikolaus Lenau (Romanian lyrics by Mihai Eminescu)	1920	Cluj-Napoca
Das Jugendbuch (Omar der Zeltmacher)	Omar Khayyam German translation by Friedrich Rosen	1937	Cluj-Napoca
Departe	Octavian Goga	1921	Cluj-Napoca
Der Baum der Erinnerung	Nikolaus Lenau	1928	Cluj-Napoca
Der Nachtwind	Heinrich Heine	1927	Cluj-Napoca
Der Seelenkranke	Nikolaus Lenau	1928	Cluj-Napoca
Die bezaubernde Stelle	Nikolaus Lenau	1913	Biserica Albă
Die Botschaft	Heinrich Heine	1932	Cluj-Napoca
Die Entschwundene	Gottfried Keller	1953	Cluj-Napoca
Die schlanke Wasserlilie	Heinrich Heine	1910	Hunedoara
Din noaptea...	Mihai Eminescu	1921	Cluj-Napoca
Doină	Mihai Eminescu	1950	Cluj-Napoca
Dorurile mele (Vágayim...)	Octavian Goga (Hungarian lyrics by Bretan)	1907	Hunedoara
Egy lélek állt	Sándor Reményik	1959	Cluj-Napoca
Egy mondat	Jules Supervielle	1953	Cluj-Napoca
Ein Fichtenbaum	Heinrich Heine	1905	Năsăud
Einsamkeit	Nikolaus Lenau	1930	Cluj-Napoca
Ereszkedik le a felhő	Sándor Petőfi	1933	Cluj-Napoca
Ernst ist der Frühling	Heinrich Heine	1929	Cluj-Napoca
Es haben unsre Herzen…	Heinrich Heine	1929	Cluj-Napoca
Es ragt ins Meer…	Heinrich Heine	1915	Oradea
Es war ein alter König	Heinrich Heine	1930	Cluj-Napoca
Eu nu vreau...	Nicolae Bretan	1929	Cluj-Napoca
Fată mare	Octavian Goga	1921	Cluj-Napoca
Fatma	George Coșbuc	1925	Cluj-Napoca
Feleségem	Sándor Kibédi	1931	Cluj-Napoca
Frage	Nikolaus Lenau	1913	Biserica Albă
Fragment din "Casa noastră"	Octavian Goga	1921	Cluj-Napoca
Fragment din "Scisoarea a IV-a"	Mihai Eminescu	1932	Cluj-Napoca
Fresco-Ritornele	George Coșbuc	1931	Cluj-Napoca
Frühlingsgedränge	Nikolaus Lenau	1913	Biserica Albă
Futurum imperfectum	Dezső Varró	1951	Cluj-Napoca
Gazel	George Coșbuc	1925	Cluj-Napoca
Hazamegyek a falumba	Endre Ady	1940	Cluj-Napoca
Herbst	Nikolaus Lenau	1913	Biserica Albă
Herbstgefühl	Nikolaus Lenau	1921	Cluj-Napoca
Herbstklage	Nikolaus Lenau	1928	Cluj-Napoca
Herbsttag	Rainer Maria Rilke	1951	Cluj-Napoca
Husarenlied	Nikolaus Lenau	1922	Cluj-Napoca
Húsz év múlva	János Vajda	1962	Cluj-Napoca
Ich möchte dir einen Strahl senden	Nicolae Bretan	1913	Biserica Albă
Ich wandle unter Blumen	Heinrich Heine	1929	Cluj-Napoca
Ich wollte, meine Lieder	Heinrich Heine	1922	Cluj-Napoca
Ideal	George Coșbuc	1929	Cluj-Napoca
Im Vorfrühling	Heinrich Heine	1925	Cluj-Napoca
Imádság háború után	Endre Ady	1940	Cluj-Napoca
In memoriam E.	Nicolae Bretan	1929	Cluj-Napoca
Inima (A szív)	Octavian Goga (Hungarian lyrics by Bretan)	1920	Cluj-Napoca
Isten drága pénze	Endre Ady	1949	Cluj-Napoca
În fereastra despre mare	Mihai Eminescu	1909	Vienna
În parcul Luxemburg	Victor Eftimiu	1927	Cluj-Napoca
Kicsapott a folyó	Sándor Petőfi	1927	Cluj-Napoca
Kidalolatlan magyar nyarak	Endre Ady	1910	Hunedoara
Kindheit (Gyermekkor)	Rainer Maria Rilke (Hungarian lyric by Dezső Kosztolányi)	1955	Cluj-Napoca
Kis, karácsonyi ének	Endre Ady	1910	Hunedoara
Kisvárosok őszi vasárnapjai	Endre Ady	1946	Cluj-Napoca
Kocsiút az éjszakában	Endre Ady	1932	Cluj-Napoca
Közel a temetőhöz	Endre Ady	1949	Cluj-Napoca
Közelitő tél (Nahender Winter)	Meng Haoran Hungarian translation by Dezső Kosztolányi (German lyrics by Bretan)	1943	Cluj-Napoca
Krisztus-kereszt az erdön	Endre Ady	1940	Cluj-Napoca
Küsse, die man stiehlt im Dunkeln	Heinrich Heine	1929	Cluj-Napoca
La groapa lui Laie	Octavian Goga	1921	Cluj-Napoca
La steaua	Mihai Eminescu	1928	Cluj-Napoca
Lacul	Mihai Eminescu	1901	Năsăud
Lasă-ți lumea ta uitată	Mihai Eminescu	1921	Cluj-Napoca
Lámpafény	Dezső Kosztolányi	1947	Cluj-Napoca
Lângă drumul vechi de țară	Nicolae Bretan	1928	Cluj-Napoca
Legény kesergője	folklore	1905	Cluj-Napoca
Lemuel vallomása (I)	Illés Kaczér	1928	Cluj-Napoca
Lemuel vallomása (II)	Illés Kaczér	1928	Cluj-Napoca
Liniște (Csend)	Victor Eftimiu (Hungarian lyrics by Bretan)	1927	Cluj-Napoca
Liszt Ferenchez (Odă lui Liszt)	Mihály Vörösmarty (Romanian lyrics by Bretan)	1935	Cluj-Napoca
Lovas út	Elek Turcsányi	1910	Budapest
Lună, lună, stea vicleană	Octavian Goga	1912	Cluj-Napoca
Ma neked, holnap nekem	Sándor Reményik	1928	Cluj-Napoca
Magányos vadlúd (Einsame Wildgans)	Cui Tu Hungarian translation by Dezső Kosztolányi (German lyrics by Bretan)	1943	Cluj-Napoca
Magyar-bánó magyar aggyal	Endre Ady	1910	Hunedoara
Mammon-szerzetes zsoltára	Endre Ady	1950	Cluj-Napoca
Mein Herz ist leer	Christian Morgenstern	1957	Cluj-Napoca
Még egyszer	Ödön Huzella	1922	Oradea
Mi-am făcut un cântec	Octavian Goga	1920	Cluj-Napoca
Mi-e frică	Victor Eftimiu	1927	Cluj-Napoca
Mikes	József Lévay	1909	Hunedoara
Mit schwarzen Segeln	Heinrich Heine	1915	Oradea
Moartea lui Gelu	George Coșbuc	1931	Cluj-Napoca
Mors Imperator	Dezső Varró	1951	Cluj-Napoca
Mors magna	Octavian Goga	1920	Cluj-Napoca
Neuer Frühling	Heinrich Heine	1930	Cluj-Napoca
Noapte de vară	George Coșbuc	1925	Cluj-Napoca
Noi	Octavian Goga	1954	Cluj-Napoca
Nu te-ai priceput!	George Coșbuc	1925	Cluj-Napoca
O schwöre nicht und küsse nur	Heinrich Heine	1933	Cluj-Napoca
O, mamă!	Mihai Eminescu	undated	unknown
O, vin pe mare	Mihai Eminescu	1926	Cluj-Napoca
Oda limbei române	Victor Eftimiu	1927	Cluj-Napoca
Oltul	Octavian Goga	1921	Cluj-Napoca
Orbán	Sándor Petőfi	1927	Cluj-Napoca
Öröm	Ákos Gara	1931	Cluj-Napoca
Őrizem a szemed	Endre Ady	1954	unknown
Pace	Octavian Goga	1921	Cluj-Napoca
Pădurea	Victor Eftimiu	1927	Cluj-Napoca
Părăsit	Octavian Goga	1910	Hunedoara
Părăsiți	Octavian Goga	1921	Cluj-Napoca
Párisban járt az Ösz	Endre Ady	1931	Cluj-Napoca
Pe aceia și ulicioară	Mihai Eminescu	1940	Cluj-Napoca
Pe dealul Feleacului	traditional	1940	Cluj-Napoca
Pe înserate	Octavian Goga	1941	Cluj-Napoca
Pe lîngă plopii fără soț	Mihai Eminescu	1942	Cluj-Napoca
Peste vîrfuri	Mihai Eminescu	1922	Cluj-Napoca
Por és virág	Dezső Varró	1955	Cluj-Napoca
Prea sus ați fost! (Oly magasan!)	Victor Eftimiu (Hungarian lyrics by Bretan)	1923	Cluj-Napoca
Prea târziu	Nicolae Bretan	1926	Cluj-Napoca
Pribeag	Octavian Goga	1925	Cluj-Napoca
Rândunica!	Nicolae Bretan	1941	Cluj-Napoca
Rea de plată	George Coșbuc	1925	Cluj-Napoca
Reszket a bokor	Sándor Petőfi	1929	Cluj-Napoca
Românul către Tătar	Vasile Alecsandri	1930	Cluj-Napoca
S-a dus amorul	Mihai Eminescu	1926	Cluj-Napoca
S-a stins viața	Mihai Eminescu	1930	Cluj-Napoca
Sara pe deal	Mihai Eminescu	1904	Năsăud (revised 1908, Vienna)
Schattenküsse, Schattenliebe	Heinrich Heine	1929	Cluj-Napoca
Scrisoare	Zaharia Bârsan	1931	Cluj-Napoca
Se-nchină clopotul de sară	Zaharia Bârsan	1926	Cluj-Napoca
Septembrie cu roze	Mihai Eminescu	1927	Cluj-Napoca
Singur	Octavian Goga	1921	Cluj-Napoca
Síriratok	Margaret Sackville Hungarian translation by Dezső Kosztolányi	1934	Cluj-Napoca
Solus ero	Nicolae Bretan	1932	Cluj-Napoca
Somnoroase păsărele (Már az elmos kis madárka...)	Mihai Eminescu (Hungarian lyrics by Bretan)	1912	Hunedoara
Spune-mi codrule vecine	Zaharia Bârsan	1926	Cluj-Napoca
Stelele-n cer	Mihai Eminescu	1931	Cluj-Napoca
Steluța	Vasile Alecsandri	1941	Cluj-Napoca
Sterne	Heinrich Heine	1929	Cluj-Napoca
Stille Sicherheit	Nikolaus Lenau	1913	Biserica Albă
Stridențe	Victor Eftimiu	1928	Cluj-Napoca
Stumme Liebe	Nikolaus Lenau	1913	Biserica Albă
Sus la cârcimă	Octavian Goga	1921	Cluj-Napoca
Száll a felhő	Sándor Petőfi	1912	Budapest
Szerelemnek rózsafája	Sándor Petőfi	1929	Cluj-Napoca
Ș-acele dulci păreri de rău	Mihai Eminescu	1937	Cluj-Napoca
Și dacă ramuri bat în geam	Mihai Eminescu	1909	Vienna
Tavaszi vers	Béla Zsolt	1923	Cluj-Napoca
Te duci și-am înțeles prea bine	Mihai Eminescu	1933	Cluj-Napoca
Te duci și ani de suferința	Mihai Eminescu	1927	Cluj-Napoca
Te nélküled	Ödon Huzella	1922	Oradea
Ti éjbe hull órák	Dezső Varró	1951	Cluj-Napoca
Titkos koppanás	Albert Baradlai	1952	Cluj-Napoca
Új könyvem federlére	Endre Ady	1950	Cluj-Napoca
Valse triste	Nicolae Bretan	undated	unknown
Vándor a hegyek között	Tivadar Fekete	1931	Cluj-Napoca
Vándorútam (Mein Wanderweg)	Kujō Yoshitsune Hungarian translation by Dezső Kosztolányi (German lyrics by Bretan)	1943	Cluj-Napoca
Vergangenheit	Nikolaus Lenau	1913	Biserica Albă
Vers posthume	Sarolta Lányi	1912	Budapest
Végzetem	Olimpia Mihăilescu	1958	Cluj-Napoca
Vin' sub plopul	Octavian Goga	1920	Cluj-Napoca
Vin țiganii	Constantin Argintaru	1937	Cluj-Napoca
Vorwurf	Nikolaus Lenau	1928	Cluj-Napoca
Wandl' ich im dem Wald	Heinrich Heine	1915	Oradea
Weil du mir zu früh entschwunden	unknown	1913	Budapest
Weil ich dich liebe	Heinrich Heine	1929	Cluj-Napoca
Welke Rose	Nikolaus Lenau	1904	Năsăud (revised 1910, Budapest)
Wenn du mir vorüberwandelst	Heinrich Heine	1929	Cluj-Napoca
Wenn ein müder Leib begraben	Klaus Groth	1912	Munich
Wie die Nelken duftig atmen	Heinrich Heine	1929	Cluj-Napoca
Wie des Mondes Abbild zittert	Heinrich Heine	1929	Cluj-Napoca
Zilahi ember nótája	Endre Ady	1954	Cluj-Napoca

== Sacred music ==
- Pleacă, Domane, urechea ta (from Psalm 50) for voice and piano, 1904
- Tatăl nostru (Our Father) for voice and piano, 1927
- Născătoare de Dumnezeu (Ave Maria) for voice and piano, 1927
- Requiem for baritone and mezzosoprano and organ or piano, 1932
- Din Psalmul 102 (Psalm 102) for voice and piano, 1941
- Din Psalmul 104 (Psalm 104) for voice and piano, 1941
- Priceasnă (Prayer) for voice and piano, 1944
- Acum, slobozeşte în pace... (Luke 2:19-35) for voice and piano, 1944
- Cine este-acesta care vine din Edom? (Isaiah 63) for voice and piano, 1952

== Choral music ==
- Jelige for mixed chorus a cappella, text by Zoltán Szőnyi, 1930
- Apotheosis for mixed chorus, 2 trumpets and piano, text by József Bajza, 1930
- Prietenia între popoare for men's chorus and orchestra, text by Bretan, 1951
- L'hymne olympique (Imn olimpic) for mixed chorus and orchestra, French translation of text by Pindar (Romanian text by Bretan), 1954
- Cântec pentru prietenia Româno-Maghiară for mixed chorus and orchestra, text by Bretan, undated

== Instrumental music ==
- Mic Dans Românesc (Little Romanian Dance) for orchestra, 1922
- Danse de Polichinelle for piano, 1929
- Waltz for piano, 1930
- Vals Românesc for piano, 1930
- Vals Românesc Nr. 2 for piano, 1930
- Induló / Marş for piano, 1947
- Serenadă for violin and piano, 1955
- Prelude for orchestra, undated
