= Elena Moșuc =

Romanian operatic soprano

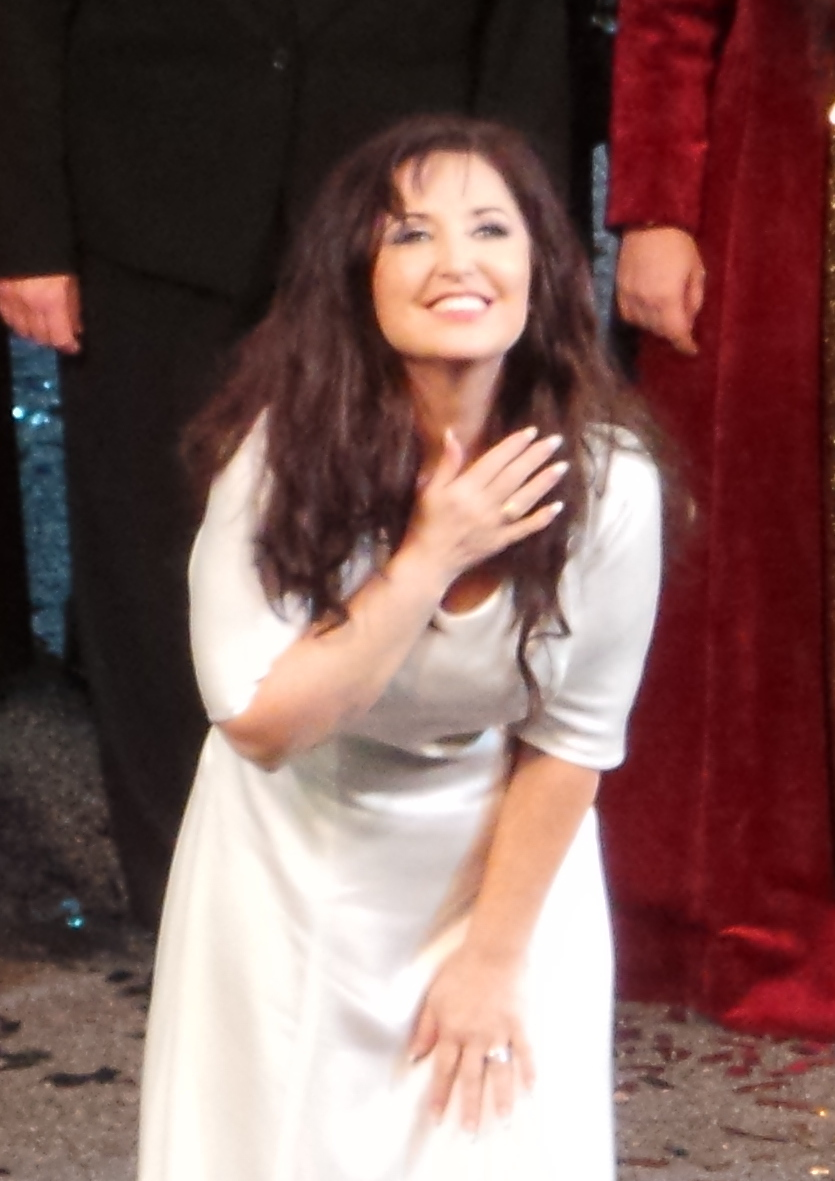
- Elena Moșuc in Lucia di Lammermoor at the Liceu, 2015
- Born: January 18, 1964 (age 62); Iași, Romanian People's Republic
- Other name: Elena Mosuc
- Education: George Enescu National University of Arts
- Occupation: Operatic soprano
- Years active: 1990–present
- Organization: Zurich Opera House
- Spouse: Christoph Hebeisen (m. 1993)
- Website: www.mosuc.com

Elena Moșuc (born January 18, 1964) is a Romanian operatic soprano. Associated to the Zürich Opera House, she has an active career primarily in Europe, including guest appearances at the Romanian National Operas since 1990.

== Life and career ==
=== Early years ===
Moșuc was born in Iași. Since the age of 16, she studied at the Școala Populară de Arte in her native city for almost five years, with her teachers including Mioara Cortez. Since she was 18, she taught in a primary school for seven years. Meanwhile, she pursued her singing studies through private lessons. At the end of her studies, she made her opera debut in February 1990 with the Queen of the Night (Mozart's The Magic Flute) at the Romanian National Opera, Iași, where she was a chorister in 1989/90. She later performed Lucia (Lucia di Lammermoor), Gilda (Rigoletto), Violetta (La traviata). After the Romanian Revolution of 1989, she finally entered in July 1990 the George Enescu National University of Arts, where her studies lasted for seven years.

In September 1990, she won the first prize at the ARD International Music Competition in Munich, which opened the way for an international career. In 1991, she won the International Monte-Carlo Music Competition.

Immediately after winning the ARD Competition, Moșuc sang her second Queen of the Night in Munich. She became associated with the role, which she would sing more than 250 times, and with which she made her Vienna State Opera debut (1993), Italian debut in Rome (2000), Paris Opera debut (2002), and Royal Opera House debut (2003).

=== Zürich Opera ===
Moșuc made her debut at the Opernhaus Zürich in 1991 as soloist. Originally in a contract of three years, she remained as a troop member till 2000 and continued the association, which lasted for more than two decades.

Recognised by intendant Alexander Pereira, she was offered roles which constitutes the majority of her repertoire, and regularly alternated roles with Edita Gruberová. She dominated coloratura soprano roles at the House during Gruberová's absence due to the tension between the singer and the intendant.

She appeared in various roles, among others as the Queen of the Night, Konstanze (Die Entführung aus dem Serail), Donna Anna (Don Giovanni), Lucia (Lucia di Lammermoor), Linda (Linda di Chamounix), Elvira (I puritani), Gilda (Rigoletto), Violetta (La traviata), Luisa (Luisa Miller), Sophie (Der Rosenkavalier), Zerbinetta (Ariadne auf Naxos), Aminta/Timidia (Die schweigsame Frau), Musetta (La bohème), Micaëla (Carmen), Marguerite (Gounod's Faust), Liù (Puccini's Turandot), Medora (Il corsaro), Nedda (Pagliacci), Mrs. Alice Ford (Falstaff), Stella, Olympia, Antonia and Giulietta (The Tales of Hoffmann).

=== Performances elsewhere ===
In 2005, Moșuc was featured in Franco Zeffirelli's new production of La traviata, opening Israeli Opera's 2005/06 season.

In June 2008, she made her first appearance at the New National Theatre Tokyo with La traviata, and returned in December with Donna Anna in a new production of Don Giovanni.

In October 2010, Moșuc made her United States debut at the New York Metropolitan Opera as Olympia in The Tales of Hoffmann, sharing the role with Anna Christy. In October 2011, she opened the season at the Dallas Opera in the title role in Lucia di Lammermoor.

In 2012, she starred in the original 1912 version of Ariadne auf Naxos at the Salzburg Festival.

In 2019, she made her role debut in Lakmé at the Royal Opera House Muscat. This was the company's first-ever original opera production.

== Achievements ==
Moșuc received many prestigious prizes. She was awarded the "European Furtherance Prize for Music" (Europäischer Förderpreis für Musik) in 1993, and the Premio "Bellini d'Oro" in Catania in 1995. In 2002, Moșuc received the Premio "Zenatello" in Verona, and in 2004 the "Premio Verdi di Modena" and the "Premio Verdi di Verona". In 2009, Moșuc was the first soprano from Eastern Europe to receive the international award Siola d'oro.

In 2005, Moșuc was appointed an "Officer of the Arts" (Ofițer al Artelor) by the Romanian presidency. She received the 2009 edition of "Woman of the Year" award (Femeia Anului) in the category of "Ambassador of Romanian Arts from Abroad". In the same year, she received her doctor's degree in music science from the National University of Music Bucharest. In 2010, Elena Moșuc became honorary citizen of her native city Iași. In 2015, she received the "Grand Prize of the National Operas of Romania".

In 2019, Elena Moșuc has been awarded with the International Opera Awards - "Oscar della Lirica" - as the world's best soprano of the year.

== Discography ==
- Mozart Portrait. Iași "Moldova" Philharmonic Orchestra, Camil Marinescu. Arte Nova Voices 2000
- Au jardin de mon cœur. Hungarian State Symphony Orchestra, Jan Schultsz. Arte Nova Voices 2000
- Notre Amour – French and Romanian songs. Sabine Vatin, piano. Arte Nova Voices 2002
- Flavio Motalla: L'amore è poesia – Vocalises for Soprano & Orchestra. Royal Philharmonic Orchestra, John Scott. 2011. (reissued on Solo Musica 2016)
- Donizetti Heroines. Symphony Orchestra of Croatian Radio-Television, Ivo Lipanović. Sony Classical 2013
- A Portrait. [compilation] Sony Classical 2015
- Verdi Heroines. Zagreb Philharmonic Orchestra, Ivo Lipanović. Solo Musica 2018
