= Romanian National Opera =

Romanian National Opera may refer to a number of national opera and ballet companies in Romania:

- Romanian National Opera, Bucharest
- Romanian National Opera, Cluj-Napoca
- Romanian National Opera, Iași
- Romanian National Opera, Timișoara
