= Marina Krilovici =

German opera singer

- Born: 11 June 1942 (age 84); Bucharest, Kingdom of Romania
- Genre: Opera

Marina Krilovici (born 11 June 1942) is an opera soprano of Romanian birth.

== Early life ==
Her first teacher and the most important was Mme Livia Vațianu-Vrăbiescu. Krilovici completed her studies at the Ciprian Porumbescu music academy in Bucharest. She received a scholarship to go to Italy and study with coaches like Maria Caniglia and Luigi Ricci. Her talent, musicality and voice distinguished her in such international competitions as George Enescu 1964, Hertogenbosch 1966, Brussels 1966, and Montreal 1967, where she earned first prize and a gold medal. Debuting in 1966 at the National Opera of Bucharest as Donna Anna in Don Giovanni, she continued performing at the Opera of Bucharest, with achievements in lyric and dramatic roles. From 1968 to 1976 she was a member of the Hamburg State Opera. In 1971, she defected from Romania and settled in Germany, United States and Greece.

== Germany ==
In 1973, Krilovici became a German citizen. The artist, who was married until 1993 to the late baritone Kostas Paskalis (1929–2007), with whom she has two children, Constantin, b. 1974, and Alexandra, b. 1977, has performed in major world theatres, including Hamburg, Vienna, Chicago, Metropolitan Opera New York, Covent Garden, Rome, Berlin, Paris, Lisbon, La Fenice, Munich and Montreal. In 1968 and 1969, she was heard at the Toronto Opera House as Floria Tosca. In the years 1970–1978 she appeared at the Vienna State Opera in roles like Santuzza in Mascagni's Cavalleria rusticana, Tosca, and Élisabeth de Valois in Verdi's Don Carlos.

In 1972, she performed at the Deutsche Oper Berlin as Santuzza. Other guest appearances at La Fenice in Venice (1971, as Tosca), the Covent Garden Opera London (1971, Aida, opposite the celebrated Romanian mezzo-soprano Viorica Cortez), the Teatro Nacional de São Carlos (1975 as Manon Lescaut and 1978 as Tosca), the Opéra national du Rhin, Strasbourg (1976, Tatiana in Eugene Onegin), the Opéra de Monte-Carlo (1979, Élisabeth), La Monnaie (1979, Amelia in Donizetti's Il Duca d'Alba), and the Scottish Opera in Glasgow (1980, Tosca). In 1985–1986, she was a guest performer at the Opéra Royal de Wallonie Liege as Tosca. She was also a guest in Amsterdam, Copenhagen, Mexico City and 1982–1985 several times in Athens, where she sang Leonora in La forza del destino by Verdi.

== United States ==
Krilovici had a successful United States career as well, making her debut there in 1972 at the San Francisco Opera as Aïda. From 1972–1974, she sang at the Lyric Opera of Chicago as Mimi, the tragic heroine of Puccini's La bohème, and as Cio-Cio-San. She sang at the Opera House of New Orleans in 1975 as Tosca and appeared at Miami Opera in 1979 as Élisabeth in Don Carlos. In the seasons 1973–1974 and 1975–1977 she was engaged at the New York Metropolitan Opera where she sang Cio-Cio-San, Giorgetta in Puccini's Il tabarro, and Leonora in Verdi's Il trovatore.

She sang with renowned singers (Plácido Domingo, Luciano Pavarotti, Tito Gobbi, José Carreras, Renato Bruson, Nikolai Giaurov, Nicola Ghiuselev, Giangiacomo Guelfi, Fiorenza Cossotto, Shirley Verrett, and Nicola Martinucci) and conductors (Claudio Abbado, Georg Solti, Nello Santi, Stein, Lorin Maazel, Riccardo Muti, and many others). Krilovici was not only known for her voice quality, but her stage presence and personality and her ability to give dimension to the characters she interpreted made her performances of Tosca, Butterfly, Aida, and Santuzza memorable.

== Greece ==
In the early '90s, her Greek nationality on her mother's side, in addition to her marriage to Greek-born Paskalis, brought her to Athens, where she started her collaboration with the Athens National Opera. Greek audiences welcomed her as she sang at the Herodion and the Athens Concert Hall. Her new career as a teacher at the Maria Callas Athenaeum Conservatory has given her the opportunity to pass on her international experience to young singers, and her devotion and love towards them has made her successful. Many of her students are already following her steps in theaters all over the world. She also participates as a jury member in international competitions and gives master classes.

== Sources ==
- Forbes, Elizabeth (1 June 2007). "Obituary: Kostas Paskalis, Warm-toned baritone singer". The Independent. Archived from the original on 18 February 2011.
- Hall, Charles J. (2002). Chronology of Western Classical Music. Vol. 1, 1751–1900. Routledge. ISBN 0415942160. OCLC 314332949.
- Ionescu, Claudiu (2003). "Lumea romaneasca: Marina Krilovici". Formula AS (in Romanian) (570).
- Metropolitan Opera. "Search results for: Krilovici, Marina [Soprano]". MetOpera Database. Archived from the original on 4 October 2011.
- "Interview with Krilovici". România Literară (42). 23 October 2009.
