= Arald =

Arald may refer to:

- Arald, version of the name Harold
- Arald (opera)
- Arald, pen name of Barbu Lăzăreanu
- Arald, Archdeacon of Wells
- Arald, Danish warrior in Gwendoline (opera) by Emmanuel Chabrier and Catulle Mendès
