= Opera in Romania =

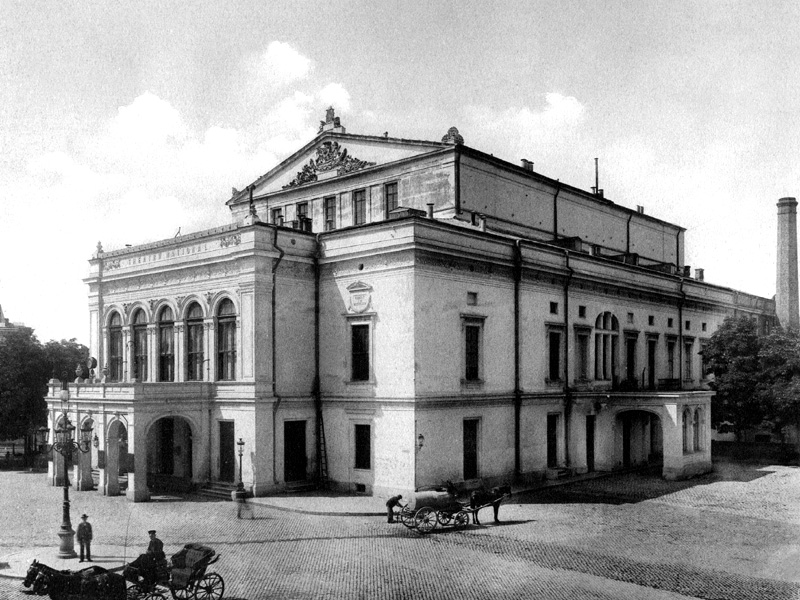
The old building of the National Theatre in Bucharest, home to many opera performances in the city until its destruction by German bombardment in 1944

The history of opera in Romania dates back to the 18th century when French, Italian, and German touring companies began performing the standard European repertoire of the day in the main cities of Romania. Home-grown opera companies both professional and amateur began forming in the 19th century. In 1843 a purpose-built theatre for the performance of Italian opera was established in Bucharest. Its inaugural performance was Bellini's Norma. Opera was also performed by the students at the conservatory established by The Philharmonic Society of Bucharest.

By the early 19th century, works by native Romanian composers began to be performed, although usually with librettos in German (or occasionally Hungarian). The notion of a Romanian national opera tradition emerged in the mid-19th century with the appearance of operas on Romanian subjects, often based on historical events, with Romanian-language librettos.

The country's principal national opera company, Romanian National Opera, Bucharest (Opera Națională București), had its roots in the formation of the Opera Society (Societatea Opera). In 1921 under the patronage of Queen Maria and Octavian Goga the society became a state institution with state funding. Their inaugural performance was on 8 December 1921 with George Enescu conducting the Bucharest premiere Wagner's Lohengrin. Further national opera companies were established in Timișoara, Iași, and Cluj.

== Opera houses and companies ==
In addition to smaller opera companies such as Opera Brașov in Brașov, Craiova Romanian Opera in Craiova, and the Hungarian Opera in Cluj-Napoca, Romania has four national opera companies:

- Romanian National Opera, Bucharest
- Romanian National Opera, Cluj-Napoca
- Romanian National Opera, Iași
- Romanian National Opera, Timișoara

Operas and operettas are also performed at the National Theatre of Opera and Ballet "Oleg Danovski" in Constanța, the Nae Leonard Theatre in Galați, and the National Operetta Theatre in Bucharest.
