= Nicolae Bretan =

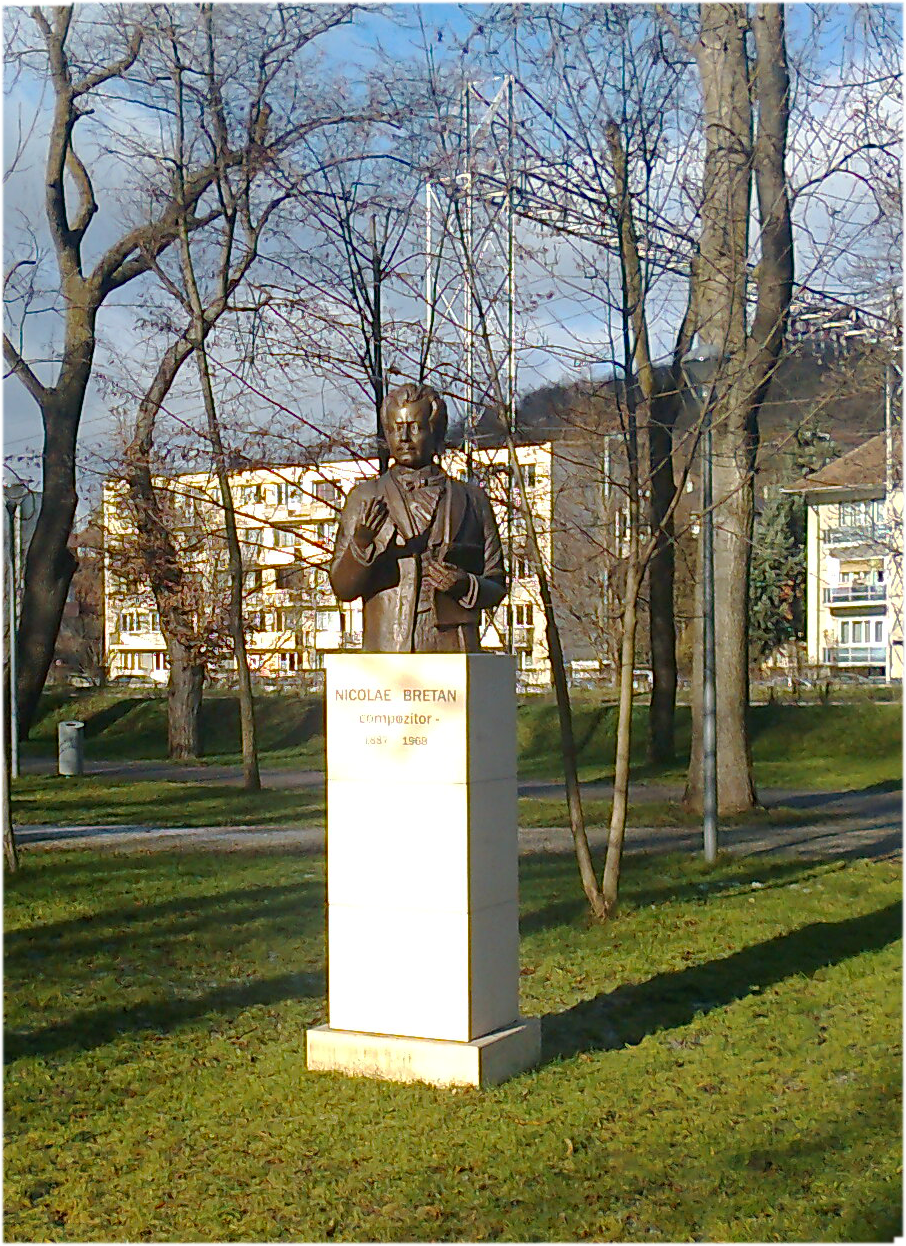
- Bust of Bretan in Cluj-Napoca Central Park

Background information
- Also known as: Bretán Miklós
- Born: 25 March 1887; Năsăud, Beszterce-Naszód County, Kingdom of Hungary, Transleithania, Austria-Hungary
- Died: 1 December 1968 (aged 81) Cluj, Socialist Republic of Romania
- Genres: Opera
- Occupations: Conductor, composer, music critic
- Instrument: Voice (baritone)

Nicolae Bretan (Hungarian: Bretán Miklós; 25 March 1887 – 1 December 1968) was a Romanian opera composer, baritone, conductor, and music critic.

== Biography ==
Bretan was born in Năsăud. He studied at the Conservatory of Cluj (1906–1908), and the Vienna Music Academy (1908) where he studied with Gustav Geiringer and Julius Meixner. In 1912 he enrolled at the National Hungarian Royal Academy of Music in Budapest. In 1916, he received a degree in law at the University of Cluj.

In addition to composing, Bretan held various positions as baritone singer, actor, stage director, and director-general. He made his professional debut as a singer in 1913 in Bratislava, continuing to roles in Oradea and at the Hungarian Theatre of Cluj, where he served as first baritone from 1922 to 1940. Over his career he performed works by Verdi, Gounod, Bizet, Puccini, Wagner, Tchaikovsky, Delibes, and Rossini.

As a director, Bretan staged works by fellow Romanian composers—Brediceanu, Drăgoi, Monţia, Negrea—as well as by members of the European canon further afield: Mozart, Gluck, Wagner, Verdi, Puccini, others. He was named director-general of the Romanian Theater and Opera of Cluj in 1944.

Bretan also worked as a translator of libretti, translating his own Luceafărul into Hungarian and Golem into Romanian and German. In 1928 he translated Gluck's Orfeo ed Euridice into Romanian.

In 1915 Bretan married pianist Nora Osvát. Together they had two children: Andrei (baritone) and Judit (actor and educator). In 1944, Osvát's family, who were Jewish, were transported to the Auschwitz concentration camp and murdered.

Refusing to become a member of the Romanian Communist Party in 1948, he was not favoured by the Romanian communist regime, who treated the composer as a "non-person". Biographer Hartmut Gagelmann attributes Bretan's lack of wider recognition to censorship by the Communist Party of Romania, though this claim has been disputed by contemporary scholars.

Bretan died in Cluj, aged 81, and was buried in the city's Central Cemetery.

== Compositions ==
Bretan composed six operatic works. His best-known work is the opera Luceafărul (1921) based on a poem by the Romantic poet Mihai Eminescu. In addition, he composed numerous lieder, a requiem, and several pieces of sacred music—as well as a handful of choral, chamber, and orchestral pieces.

=== Works for the stage ===
- Luceafărul (1921), libretto by Bretan after the 1883 poem of the same name by Mihai Eminescu
- Golem (1924) Golem Lásadása, Oper 1924, after Golem von Illés Kaczér
- Eroii de la Rovine (1935)
- Horia (1937) to libretto by Ghiță Popp
- Arald (1942) after Mihai Eminescu's "Strigoii" (Ghosts), premiered 1982 in Iași
- A Különös Széder-est, (1945) premiered 1974

=== Lieder ===
Between 1900 and 1962, Bretan wrote over 200 lieder based on texts by Endre Ady, Eminescu, Octavian Goga, Heinrich Heine, Nikolaus Lenau, and others. Bretan primarily chose poetic texts in Romanian, Hungarian, and German, occasionally penning his own translation of the source material into another of the three languages.

== Legacy ==
In 2010, two busts of the composer busts were inaugurated in Cluj-Napoca. One in front of the Romanian National Opera, Cluj-Napoca, and another in front of the Cluj-Napoca Hungarian Opera.

In November 2011, at the Tudor Jarda Music High School in Bistrița, Bretan's bronze bust, made by the artist Ana Rus from Bucharest, was unveiled at the initiative of Judit Bretan Le Bovit, the composer's daughter.

In October 2013, another bust, also the work of the sculptor Ana Rus, was unveiled at the central alley of "Simion Barnuțiu" Park in Cluj, being donated to the city by the composer's daughter. Another bust is placed at the Iuliu Maniu Square in Alba Iulia, and is standing next to Lucian Blaga's bust.

== Recordings ==
- Golem and Arald on Electrecord 02659 (1987) and Nimbus NI 5424 (1995) (Golem: Agache, Dároczy, Sandru, Zancu; Arald: Zancu, Agache, Voineag, Sandru; Moldova Philharmonic orchestra and choir/conductor: Cristian Mandeal)
- Luceafărul on Electrecord 03657/58 (1987) (Voineag, Zancu, Șandru, Donose; Moldova Philharmonic orchestra and choir/conductor: Cristian Mandeal)
- Luceafărul (The Evening Star) on Nimbus NI 5463 (1996) (Voineag, Szabó, Croitoru, Casian; Transsylvanian Philharmonic Orchestra/conductor: Béla Hary)
- Horia on Nimbus NI5513/14 (1997) (Crăsnaru, Cornelia Pop, Buciuceanu, Fânăţeanu; Bucharest National Opera Choir, Bucharest Opera Orchestra/conductor: Cornel Trailescu) (live recording, 1980)
- Requiem (mezzo-soprano, baritone, organ) and selections from Spiritual Songs (baritone, piano, organ) on Nimbus NI 5584 (1999) (Konya, Bryn-Julson, Stalford, Sutherland, Weiss, Berkofsky)

== Sources ==
- The Oxford Illustrated History of Opera, ed. Roger Parker (1994)
- Booklet accompanying CD of Golem and Arald (Nimbus NI 5424 (1995))
