= Horia (Bretan) =

Horia is a 1937 Romanian-language opera by Nicolae Bretan to a libretto by Ghiță Popp. The story is based on the story of Vasile Ursu Nicola "Horia", the 1784 Transylvania Romanian peasants revolt led by Horia, Cloșca and Crișan. The opera premiered on January 24, 1937 at the Romanian Opera, Cluj. It received its radio premiere on July 27, 1975.

== Roles ==
Principal characters
Role	Voice type	World premiere cast	1980 Bucharest cast	1985 recorded selections
Horia, Supreme Commander of the uprising	Bass-baritone	M. Săveanu	Gheorghe Crăsnaru	Vasile Cătană
Cloșca	Baritone	M. Arnăutu	Emil Iurașcu	Mugur Bogdan
Crișan	Tenor	I. Rânzescu	Marcel Angelescu	Ion Lazăr
Dochia, Horia's wife	Contralto	L. Pop	Iulia Buciuceanu	Georgeta Orlovski-Bogdan
Ileana, their daughter	Soprano	M. Nestorescu	Cornelia Pop	
Ionel, her fiancé	Tenor	I. Andreescu	Corneliu Fănăţeanu	
Baron Kemény, governor of Transylvania	Bass	V. Siomin	Dan Zacu	Titus Pauliuc
Baron Nyíl	Tenor/Baritone	Ch. Moarcăș	Lucian Marinescu	
Baroness Hunfy	Soprano	M. Mihai	Matilda Onofrei-Vioculeţ	
Nuţu, Baroness Hunfy's serf	Tenor	Gh. Znamirovschi	Constantin Iliescu	
Pavel, a serf	Baritone	Tr. Miclea	Nicolae Urziceanu	
Costan, a priest	Bass-baritone	S. Chirvai	Adrian Ștefănescu	

== Instrumentation ==
The opera is scored for the following instruments:

- 2 flutes, 2 oboes, 2 clarinets, 2 bassoons
- 4 horns, 3 trumpets, 3 trombones
- percussion
- harp
- strings

== Synopsis ==
Horia, a peasant, arrives at the court of Baron Kemény to plead for reforms to ease the plight of the serfs. The men disagree over gradual versus drastic reform, and disagreement ends with the Baron threatening Horia with death. Meanwhile, Horia's wife, Dochia, and daughter, Ileana, are visited at their home by Ileana's fiancé, Ionel. Sensing danger is at hand, the women plead with him to remain at home, but Ionel leaves to join Horia. The women are then visited by Baron Nyíl, who intends to take Ileana for himself. Dochia grabs an axe to defend her daughter and herself, when they are interrupted by Horia, who swears justice will be done before dismissing the baron.

In a tavern two serfs discuss their treatment at the hands of the nobility. Pavel is despondent over the loss of his wife, but Nuţu is resolved to avenge his wife's and son's deaths. Both decide to join Horia's rebellion. The serfs convene and Horia tries to quell their fears, extolling virtue and humanity over vengeance. Horia's vision of a just, peaceful cause wins out, and leaders are elected: Cloșca will lead the Romanian campaign, Crișan will lead the Hungarian campaign, and Horia is named commander. The compact is sealed with a pledge of faith.

After the rebellion is underway, the serfs demand retribution for their grievances. Nuţu plans to execute Baroness Hunfy for killing his relatives, but Horia stops him. Nuţu brands Horia a traitor to the peasantry for his friendship to Baron Kép, who saved Horia's life. Nuţu reveals that Kép was visiting Hunfy and that Nuţu has set her castle alight, killing the baron. News arrives that the aristocracy have fled to Fort Deva and that imperial troops will rescue them unless the peasants can get there first.

As the next scene opens the revolt has been quashed and from Deva the nobles plot the capture of Horia. They search the captive peasants for one who will betray their leader: Ionel refuses and kills himself, but Nuţu agrees.

The leaders are captured; Crișan has committed suicide, Horia and Cloșca are sentenced to death. Horia's pleas for the people fall on deaf ears, as do Ileana's petitions for clemency. Horia and Cloșca are taken to be executed and the curtain falls.

== Recordings ==
- Horia on Nimbus NI5513/14 (1980, CD issue 1997) (Cornelia Pop, Buciuceanu, Fânăţeanu; Bucharest National Opera Choir, Bucharest Opera Orchestra/conductor: Cornel Trailescu) (live recording)
- Horia (Selecțiuni) on Electrecord – ST-ECE 02703 (1985) (Ansamblul Operei Române din Cluj-Napoca, conductor: Ion Iancu)
