= Golem (Bretan opera) =

Golem is a one-act opera by Nicolae Bretan to his own libretto, based on the legend of the Golem as expressed in a drama by Illés Kaczér. It was written over a brief period in 1923, and was first performed on 23 December 1924 at the Hungarian Opera, Cluj.

== Roles ==
Roles	Voice type	Premiere Cast, 1924 (Conductor: Nicolae Bretan)
Rabbi Lőw	tenor	Ö. Réthely
Anna, (his granddaughter)	soprano	E. Bethlen
Golem	baritone	M. Takács
Baruch, the Rabbi's disciple	bass	F. Harksay
Chorus of the Autumn Winds

== Instrumentation ==
The opera is scored for the following instruments:

- 3 flutes (piccolo), 2 oboes, English horn, 2 clarinets, bass clarinet, 2 bassoons
- 4 horns, 3 trumpets, 3 trombones, tuba
- timpani, percussion
- strings

In 2018 the opera was arranged for chamber orchestra by Tobias Schwencke for a production at Neuköllner Oper, Berlin.

== Synopsis ==
Prague in the 16th century. Rabbi Lőw (based on the historical figure), has created the Golem, a living creature, from clay. The Golem falls in love with the Rabbi's granddaughter, thereby infecting her with a fatal illness. The Rabbi destroys the Golem to save his granddaughter.

== Recording ==
- Moldova Philharmonic Orchestra, cond. Cristian Mandeal. Nimbus Records NI5424 (1987).
