= Cluj derby =

Football derby in Romania

- Location: Cluj, Romania
- Teams: CFR Cluj; Universitatea Cluj
- First meeting: CFR Cluj 8–0 Universitatea Cluj; 1920–21 Regional championship (13 October 1920)
- Latest meeting: CFR Cluj 1–3 Universitatea Cluj; Romanian Cup (28 October 2026)
- Stadiums: Stadionul Dr. Constantin Rădulescu; Cluj Arena

Statistics
- Total meetings: 91
- Most wins: Universitatea Cluj (35)

The Cluj derby (Romanian: Derbiul Clujului) refers to football matches between CFR Cluj and Universitatea Cluj, the most popular clubs in the Romanian region of Transylvania.

U Cluj	CFR Cluj

== Background and history ==
=== The Early derbies in the Antebellum Period ===
The Cluj Derby began two decades before the two teams met in the format they are today. The regions known as Transylvania (including Crisana and Maramures) and Banat, on either side of the Mures river, were part of the Kingdom of Hungary within the Austro-Hungarian Empire. The first match in the town of Cluj (then named Kolozsvar, because Transylvania was part of Austria-Hungary) was between Kolozsvar Athletic Club (KAC) which established a football section in 1904 and KKAS (the Kolozsvar Commercial Academy Students' Sporting Circle, founded in 1905). They vied for the Eastern regional championship, the champion would play in a final against the winner in the Budapest group which had 11 teams. In 1907 Kolozsvari Torna Club (Sporting Club of Cluj) was founded as the railways team, later that decade it changed its name to Kolozsvari Vasutas Sport Club(Railways Sporting Club of Cluj). KKAS won the regional title in 1908(runner up Subotica), 1909(runner up CA Arad) and 1910(runner up was CA Timișoara-Club Atletic Temesvar/Timișoara).

In 1910 the Eastern region was split in 3, Cluj falling in the Transylvania regional championship. KTC(the later CFR Cluj) won the 1911 championship for the first time against KKAS(Commercial Academy), but were eliminated by FC Kosice in the semifinals. Even though the two clubs fought fiercely for the championship, when [Galatasaray] Constantinople(today Istanbul) visited Cluj in a rematch after CFR's visit in Turkey at the inauguration of the stadium, the combined teams of CFR and Commercial Academy won with 8–1, showing they can also work together really well. Also all three teams played on the same stadium(Stadionul Orasenesc – Town's Stadium) since the inauguration in 1911.

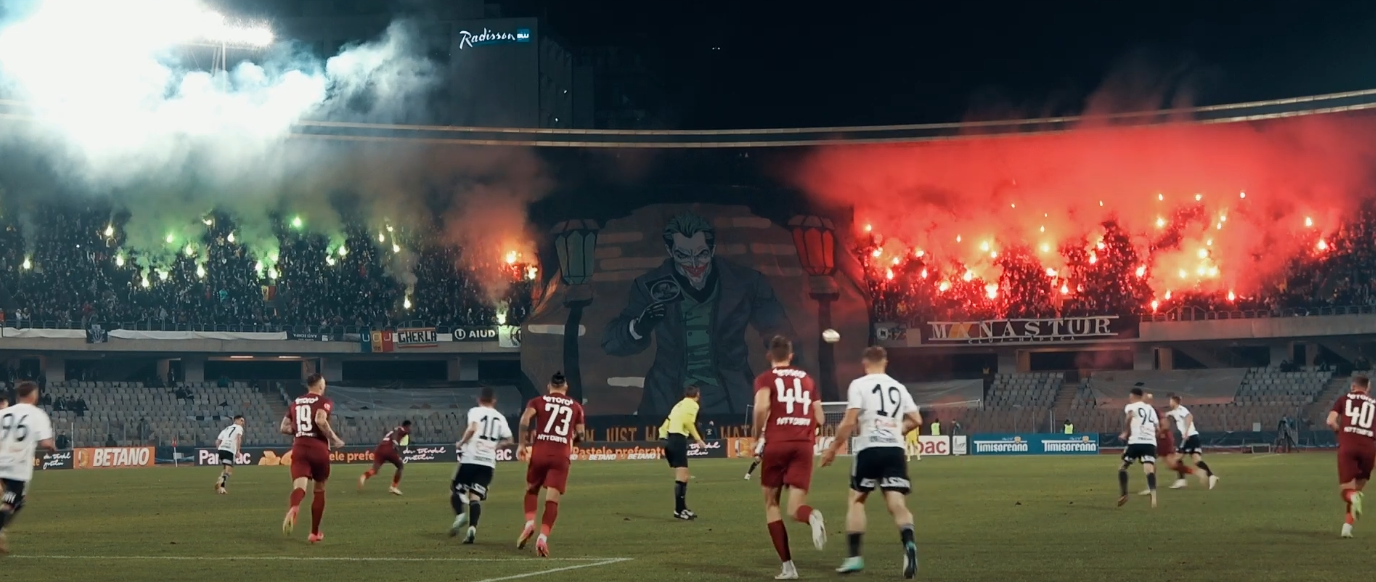
U Cluj fans choreography on 2 November 2023 against rival CFR Cluj

=== The Cluj Derby in the Interwar Period ===
After World War I, Transylvania was given to Romania at the treaties of Paris in 1919–1920 so during that year all the clubs in the region including the ones in Cluj were reformed. Since the railways in Transylvania were transferred to the Romanian railways also the team and all the patrimony was also transferred to the club that was renamed CFR Cluj(Romanian Railways Club Cluj). The other two clubs were reformed as well. Athletic Club was changed to Cluj Athletic Club, and two teams of university students were formed SSSU Cluj(Societatea Sportivă a Studenților Universitari Cluj) by Professor Iuliu Hațieganu, from students of King Ferdinand's University; and the Commercial Academy Students' Sporting Circle changed its name to Victoria Cluj(after the merger of CS Victoria and Dacia), one of the men who contributed to the birth of the club being arh. Virgil Salvan.

==== The Interbelum derby: Victoria versus U ====
These three teams CFR, U and Victoria changed places as the regional champion. At the beginning CFR was well organized and according to journalist Răzvan Toma, the first match between the two teams was played on 13 October 1920 on a field from Cluj-Napoca Central Park, CFR thrashing Universitatea 8–0. Very soon after, Victoria took the upper hand and by the season 1921-1922(the first after the unification of all Romanian lands) it became the regional champion and reached the final by eliminating Staruinta Oradea and Tricolor Bucuresti, but lost against to Chinezul Timișoara. It was the first title of vice-champion of Romania won by Victoria Cluj. The following year they matched the success they had the previous year and became regional champions and again reached the final. This final tournament had 8 regional champions not 7 as the previous one had. After eliminating Înţelegerea Oradea and Venus Bucuresti(champions in 1920 and 1921) they met on 26 August 1923 again Chinezul, this time in Cluj. They lost after 2–0. Victoria became the vice-champions of Romania for the second time. The next season, 1923–24, it was U Cluj's turn to become one of the 9 regional champions. It was their first regional title in the history of the club. Even before the war in the old format they did not get as successful as they have in that 1923–24 season. Unfortunately they were eliminated in the quarter finals by CAO(Club Atletic Oradea). The next season U Cluj became regional champions again(there were 10 regions in the 1924–25 season), thus U and Victoria had two titles each. U was stopped in the quarter finals by Jiul Petrosani(then UCAS Petrosani). In the season 1925–26, Victoria Cluj became regional(the number of regions grew to 11) champions taking the lead as regional champions by 3 to 2. They were eliminated in the preliminary round by AMEF Arad. In the 1926–27 season U Cluj became regional champions thus both U and Victoria had 3 titles. U met in the quarter finals the same opponent AMEFA which eliminated Victoria Cluj the year before. This time U Cluj qualified further to meet Chinezul Timișoara. Chinezul were to become the national champions that year, so after beating U in the semifinals they won against Coltea Brasov as well. In the 1927–28 season, Victoria Cluj changed its name to Romania Cluj. Under this name they took the lead again thus winning their 4th regional title against U and CFR. While representing Cluj nationally they eliminated Staruinta Oradea in the preliminary round, but lost in the quarter finals against Jiul Lupeni. The 1928–29 season Romania Cluj won its 5th regional title and nationally they eliminated Staruinta Oradea in the quarter finals, Banatul Timișoara in the semifinals, and lost the final with Venus Bucuresti 3–2. It was their third title of vice-champions of Romania and the last in the club's history. The following season(1929–1930) U Cluj won their 4th regional title. Nationally they eliminated Staruinta Oradea in the preliminary round and Societatea Gimnastica Sibiu in the quarter finals, but lost against Gloria CFR Arad in the semifinals.

In the 1930–31 season the cluj region was united with the west region and North Region was formed. Crisana Oradea were the champions of the region that year. The following season Crisana were the regional champions again. It was to be the last season in this format.

The 1932–33 season was about to be the first in the format of a division or league. The Divizia A had 2 series. Romania Cluj was put in Seria 1 and U Cluj in Seria 2. Romania Cluj finished 6th out of 7 and U Cluj finished 1st in its series. To decide the champion of Romania a play off match was organized between the first place of the two series. U Cluj's opponent was Ripensia Timișoara. Ripensia won 5–3 on aggregate, thus U Cluj became the first time vice-champions of Romania. The next season(1933–34) U Cluj finished 3rd in its group and Romania Cluj 5th. U Cluj also participated in the first edition of the Romanian Cup and reached the final where they lost against Ripensia Timișoara; thus becoming the first finalist in the Romanian Cup history.

The 1934–35 season was the first in Romanian football history when Divizia A had 1 league. U Cluj finished 4th and Romania Cluj 6th; CFR Cluj finished 5th and CAC (Cluj Athletic Club) finished 7th in Seria III of the Divizia B(first season of Divizia B). The next season Romania Cluj changed its name back to Victoria Cluj, and finished 10th. U Cluj finished 12th(last) but remained in the first division after the playoff against ILSA Timișoara; AC Cluj finished 5th and CFR Cluj 8th(last) in Serie III of the Divizia B, but both were relegated to the newly formed Divizia C. In the 1936–37 season of Divizia A, Victoria finished 5th and U 9th; in the third league, north-west series, CFR finished 2nd and CA 3rd.

In the 1937–38 season, Divizia A had again 2 groups, so the derby was once again played from a distance. Victoria and U were separated again, with Victoria finishing 3rd (the best place in this format) in Group 1, and U finishing 6th in Group 2. Because U finished 6th, they were relegated to Divizia B (5 teams from each group were relegated to Divizia B). In Divizia C, AC again finished 3rd, but CFR finished below CA in 4th place. In the next season, Victoria finished 6th in Divizia A, while U finished 3rd in the North-West Group of Divizia B. The 1939–40 season was the last in Divizia A for Victoria Cluj, as they finished 12th (last). It was also the season when U, from the second place in Serie III of Divizia B, promoted to the top flight.

=== The World War II Period ===
The year 1940 brought change in Romanian football as well. That's when he myth that some of Romanian sport media claims that the Cluj derby is an ethnic rivalry between the team of the Hungarian minority, represented by CFR Cluj, and the team of Romanians, which would be Universitatea Cluj, started. CFR Cluj, CA Cluj and Victoria Cluj stayed in town while U Cluj left to Sibiu when Northern Transylvania was ceded to Hungary. In some of the newspapers of the day U Cluj appears as U Cluj, in others Universitatea Sibiu and in others U Cluj-Sibiu; in that season U finished 11th(out of 13). The activity of CFR Cluj and Victoria Cluj in the Second World War is very reduced. CA Cluj was the only team that played in the Hungarian Championship. CA Cluj finished 13th place in 1941–42, 10th place in 1942–43, and 3rd place in 1943–44; also CA Cluj reached the final of the Hungarian Cup in the 1943–44 season. U in 1942 played the second final of the Romanian Cup in the club's history, but lost against Rapid Bucuresti. After Northern Transylvania was returned to Romania, U moved back to Cluj.

=== The Communist Period ===
After a pause of 5 years and due to the troubled historical frame, many teams were dissolved, others were newly founded and submitted directly in the Divizia A or Divizia B and also the teams which were moved in the Hungarian football league system in 1940 after the signing of the Second Vienna Award were moved now back in the Romanian football league system after the signing of the Paris Peace Treaties. These teams were submitted also in different leagues, not counting their last rank in the Romanian football league system, but much more their situation at that time. In the 1946–1947 season, in the first league were accepted two teams from Cluj: Ferar which finished 6th and U which finished 9th(out of 14th). In the second league(Divizia B), a new team that was founded in Cluj, Dermata, finished first in the Seria III. The other team, Victoria, which was refounded that year, finished last and was dissolved soon after. The same season, CFR Cluj played in Divizia C and earned the promotion to Divizia B.

Before the start of the 1947–48 season, CFR merged with Ferar which played in the first league the previous year, keeping the name CFR Cluj for the first league and Ferar for the second league. The first Liga I match between CFR and Universitatea took place on 7 December 1947 when Universitatea Cluj had an away victory 3–1, obtaining its first victory over CFR Cluj. The rematch took place on 9 May 1948, this time with an away victory for CFR 4–2.

Since Universitatea spent most of its history in the top tier of the Romanian football, and CFR in the lower leagues, the rivalry was almost forgotten until the 1970s. CFR earned promotion in Divizia A in 1969 and the two clubs again met. In the first three seasons together in the first division, Universitatea won the most meetings until 1972, when beat 1–0. Since then, though being the underdog in the major part of its history, CFR never lost again to Universitatea. In 1975–76 season, both CFR and Universitatea were relegated to Divizia B. In the two seasons spent in the second tier together, CFR remain undefeated, even in the 1977–78 season, when Universitatea promoted back, while CFR remained in the second division. Since then, for the major part of their histories, Universitatea spent ages in Divizia A, while CFR was a piece between second and third tier. Even during this time the rivalry was not what people in the 21st century might think, players like Constantin Radulescu and Mihai Adam played for both teams and until 1973 both teams shared the same stadium spectators cheering for both teams enjoying the spectacle in the grass, and rumors about these two teams arranging matches were circulating in those times.

=== The 21st Century Period ===
==== The Paskany era ====
In early 2000s Arpad Paskany bought the club which was in the 3rd league, after failed negotiations with U Cluj, and in 2004, CFR again earned promotion this time in Divizia A and remained undefeated against Universitatea which remained in liga II. Because of the confusion that exists among U Cluj fans about the fact that Ferar not CFR at the time participated in the Hungarian Championship, and the association between the club and the owner which is a Romanian citizen with a Hungarian ethnicity, the U Cluj fans reignited the myth that CFR Cluj is the Hungarian team and U the Romanian one, even though throughout U's history Hungarian players and coaches were a part of U Cluj team(even in the 90s and 2000s). From then, CFR became one of the most important teams in Romania, winning three league titles (in 2008, 2010, 2012) and playing in European competitions, most notably UEFA Champions League group stages, while Universitatea became the underdog team in Cluj.

On 7 May 2008, CFR beat Universitatea, the match having different aftermaths for both teams: while CFR won its first league title, Universitatea relegated to the second division. In 2010–11 season, Universitatea promoted back in Liga I (newly re-branded Divizia A) and finished 8th place, ahead defending champions of Romania, CFR (10th place), but failed to win a match against the former champions. The next season, CFR won its third league title, while Universitatea again finished 8th place. In 2013–14 season, on 24 March 2014, Universitatea beat CFR 2–1, ending a 42-year period without victory against their major rivals, but CFR qualified for UEFA Europa League, while Universitatea avoided relegation.

While financial problems and insolvency struck both clubs as of 2014, CFR remained in the top tier, unlike Universitatea, which relegated from Liga I the next year. In 2016, Universitatea relegated from the second tier, went bankrupt and was refounded in Liga IV.

After 7 years without any dispute between the two rivals, U Cluj playing during this interval in the lower divisions, on October 20, 2022, they meet again in a direct confrontation in the Romanian Cup, the match ending 1-1 at Cluj Arena, and three days later, on October 23, they meet again in the Romanian SuperLiga, score 2-1 for CFR Cluj. On March 23, 2023, CFR won at home against the rival with a score of 4-0, in an incendiary atmosphere created by more than 5000 U Cluj fans.

In 2023-2024 season, the first meeting was on August 21, at Cluj Arena, where CFR won with a score of 4-3 after being led by 0-2, in front of approximately 22,000 spectators. On November 2, the two rivals met in a cup match, which ended in a tie (1-1), but with a show in the stands with more than 3 choreographies performed by U Cluj fans.

== Statistics ==
=== Head to head results ===
As of 28 October 2026

Competition	Played	CFR wins	Draws	Universitatea wins
Liga I	43	21	12	10
Liga II	18	5	4	9
Cupa României	9	1	5	3
Regional championship	21	4	4	13
Total	91	31	25	35

=== Honours ===
CFR Cluj	Competition	Universitatea Cluj
Major
8	Liga I	0
5	Cupa României	1
4	Supercupa României	0
17	Aggregate	1
Lower leagues
2	Liga II	6
7	Liga III	2
0	Liga IV	1
9	Aggregate	9
26	Total aggregate	10

== All matches ==
CFR Cluj win Draw Universitatea Cluj win

All known meetings, as of 28 October 2026

Date	Venue	Score	Competition
13 October 1920	Field from Cluj-Napoca Central Park	8–0	Regional championship
13 March 1921	Unknown	1–1	Regional championship
12 November 1921	Unknown	2–1	Regional championship
11 June 1922	Unknown	1–0	Regional championship
1923	Unknown	4–0	Regional championship
14 May 1923	Unknown	0–0	Regional championship
1 December 1923	Unknown	1–0	Regional championship
28 June 1924	Unknown	3–1	Regional championship
2 November 1924	Unknown	1–1	Regional championship
14 June 1925	Unknown	2–1	Regional championship
25 October 1925	Unknown	0–0	Regional championship
9 May 1926	Unknown	1–3	Regional championship
14 November 1926	Unknown	1–0	Regional championship
13 March 1927	Unknown	2–1	Regional championship
13 November 1927	Unknown	2–1	Regional championship
1 April 1928	Unknown	2–1	Regional championship
28 November 1928	Unknown	2–1	Regional championship
26 May 1929	Unknown	5–0	Regional championship
27 October 1929	Unknown	4–1	Regional championship
30 March 1930	Unknown	5–0	Regional championship
1932	Unknown	1–0	Regional championship
7 December 1947	Ferar	1–3	Divizia A
9 May 1948	Ion Moina	2–4	Divizia A
5 September 1948	Ion Moina	0–1	Divizia A
27 March 1949	Ferar	1–0	Divizia A
26 March 1950	Unknown	0–0	Divizia B
29 May 1950	Unknown	3–1	Cupa României
21 August 1950	Unknown	1–2	Divizia B
22 September 1957	Unknown	3–0	Divizia B
11 May 1958	Unknown	0–6	Divizia B
8 March 1959	Ion Moina	4–2	Cupa României
18 October 1969	Ion Moina	0–0	Divizia A
28 June 1970	Clujana	1–0	Divizia A
25 October 1970	Clujana	2–1	Divizia A
9 May 1971	Ion Moina	1–1	Divizia A
24 October 1971	Clujana	0–1	Divizia A
3 May 1972	Ion Moina	1–0	Divizia A
22 October 1972	Clujana	2–1	Divizia A
13 May 1973	Ion Moina	2–2	Divizia A
7 October 1973	Ion Moina	2–2	Divizia A
5 May 1974	Dr. Constantin Rădulescu	3–3	Divizia A
15 September 1974	Ion Moina	0–0	Divizia A
9 April 1975	Dr. Constantin Rădulescu	0–0	Divizia A
28 September 1975	Dr. Constantin Rădulescu	0–0	Divizia A
25 April 1976	Ion Moina	0–1	Divizia A
26 September 1976	Unknown	0–1	Divizia B
1977	Unknown	2–0	Divizia B
1977	Unknown	0–1	Divizia B
1978	Unknown	0–0	Divizia B
1978	Unknown	2–1	Divizia B
1979	Unknown	1–4	Divizia B
25 September 1983	Unknown	0–1	Divizia B
8 April 1984	Unknown	1–0	Divizia B
25 October 1984	Unknown	1–0	Cupa României
31 August 1991	Ion Moina	1–0	Divizia B
1992	Dr. Constantin Rădulescu	1–2	Divizia B
1 November 2002	Dr. Constantin Rădulescu	0–0	Divizia B
7 May 2003	Ion Moina	1–1	Divizia B
26 September 2003	Ion Moina	0–2	Divizia B
4 April 2004	Dr. Constantin Rădulescu	1–0	Divizia B
12 February 2007	Dr. Constantin Rădulescu	2–0	Liga I
5 July 2008	Ion Moina	0–1	Liga I
14 October 2008	Ion Moina	3–3 (pen.)	Cupa României
24 September 2010	Cetate	1–1	Liga I
14 April 2011	Dr. Constantin Rădulescu	1–1	Liga I
19 November 2011	Dr. Constantin Rădulescu	3–1	Liga I
18 May 2012	Cluj Arena	2–3	Liga I
24 November 2012	Cluj Arena	1–2	Liga I
29 May 2013	Dr. Constantin Rădulescu	3–1	Liga I
15 September 2013	Cluj Arena	0–0	Liga I
24 March 2014	Dr. Constantin Rădulescu	1–2	Liga I
29 September 2014	Dr. Constantin Rădulescu	1–0	Liga I
4 March 2015	Dr. Constantin Rădulescu	0–0	Cupa României
1 April 2015	Cluj Arena	0–0 (pen.)	Cupa României
10 April 2015	Cluj Arena	1–0	Liga I
20 October 2022	Cluj Arena	1–1	Cupa României
23 October 2022	Cluj Arena	1–2	Liga I
13 March 2023	Dr. Constantin Rădulescu	4–0	Liga I
21 August 2023	Cluj Arena	3–4	Liga I
2 November 2023	Cluj Arena	1–1	Cupa României
21 December 2023	Dr. Constantin Rădulescu	0–4	Liga I
4 August 2024	Dr. Constantin Rădulescu	2–3	Liga I
9 December 2024	Cluj Arena	3–2	Liga I
31 March 2025	Cluj Arena	1–0	Liga I
3 May 2025	Dr. Constantin Rădulescu	1–0	Liga I
29 September 2025	Cluj Arena	2–2	Liga I
11 February 2026	Dr. Constantin Rădulescu	3–2	Liga I
16 March 2026	Cluj Arena	2–1	Liga I
25 April 2026	Dr. Constantin Rădulescu	1–0	Liga I
8 October 2026	Dr. Constantin Rădulescu	1–3	Liga I
28 October 2026	Dr. Constantin Rădulescu	1–3	Cupa României

== See also ==
- Sports rivalry
