= Viorica Cortez =

Romanian-born French mezzo-soprano

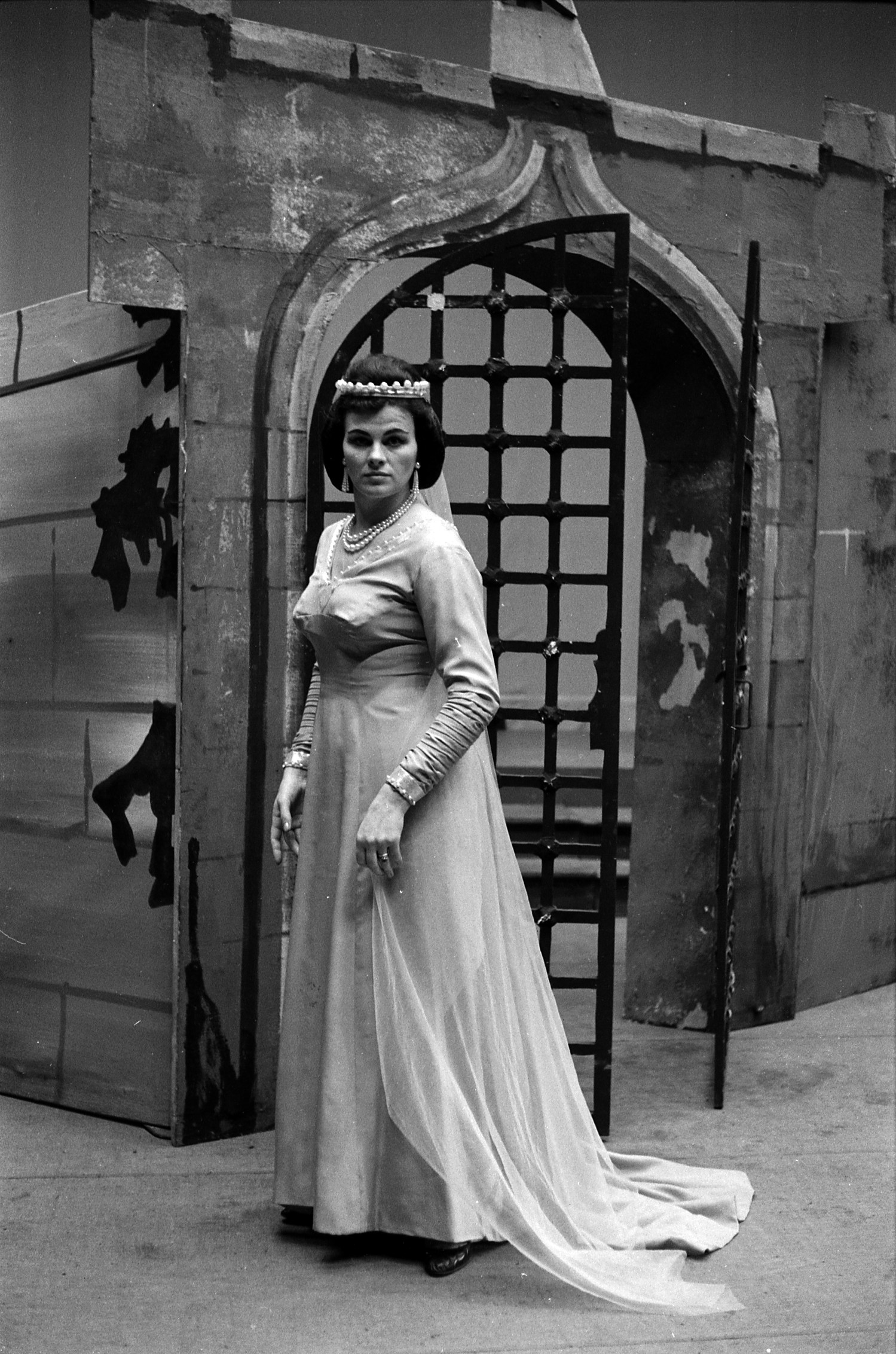
- Born: 26 December 1935; Iași, Romania
- Education: George Enescu Conservatory, Ciprian Porumbescu Conservatory
- Occupation: Opera singer (mezzo-soprano)
- Years active: 1952–2011

Viorica Cortez (born 26 December 1935) is a noted Romanian-born mezzo-soprano, later French by naturalisation. Starting her operatic and concert career in the mid-1960s, she went on to become one of the most prominent female performers of the 1970s and 1980s, and continued singing for many years after that.

== Early life ==
Viorica Cortez was born in Bucium, a village that is now part of Iași, into a family with Spanish origins. She is the eldest sister of the soprano Mioara Cortez, and of Ștefania Șerban, a professor of piano. Cortez enjoyed an artistic milieu in her parents' house, finding her passion and intense desire of studying music. She studied at the Iași Conservatory and then for three years at Bucharest's Ciprian Porumbescu Conservatory. In Iași, at the age of 17, Cortez sang the solo alto part in Beethoven's Ninth Symphony; she continued singing solo voice parts with symphony orchestras in Moldavia for a number of years.

== Studies and international recognition ==
In Bucharest, Viorica Cortez was the student of Arta Florescu, a post-war Romanian soprano and professor (besides Cortez, some of her important apprentices were Marina Krilovici, Eugenia Moldoveanu, Maria Slătinaru-Nistor, Leontina Văduva and even Angela Gheorghiu). She vividly encouraged the young mezzo-soprano to consider international competitions. Cortez took her advice and applied for the International "George Enescu" Contest in Bucharest (1964), where she ranked only fourth. The same year, she won the International Singing Contest in Toulouse, along with Romanian fellow tenor Ludovic Spiess. In Le Monde, the well-known critic Jacques Lonchampt praised her dark, velvety mezzo, her artistry and technique, as well as her glittering beauty on the stage. This victory at Toulouse was immediately followed by a contract in the city's noted Théâtre du Capitole for the year to come. In the final gala, Cortez sang Leonora's aria from Donizetti's La favorita, which was to become one of her signature concert and recital pieces.

Also in 1964, Cortez graduated from the Bucharest Conservatory, making her debut in a staged opera production - Gluck's Orphée et Eurydice. Next year, she won the Great "Kathleen Ferrier" Prize at the International Vocal Competition 's-Hertogenbosch. She made her debut in Saint-Saëns' Samson et Dalila opposite Ludovic Spiess in Cluj and then in Toulouse the same year, and she returned as Carmen one year later. Cortez then established herself as one of the most respected and recognized young Romanian opera singers, though in her native country she appeared mostly in concerts and recitals. After being hired by the Romanian National Opera in Bucharest in 1967, this changed, as she toured the country and Europe (the former Yugoslavia, France, Greece and especially Ireland), making her debut in Ambroise Thomas' Mignon, Giuseppe Verdi's Don Carlo, Aida and Il trovatore, Gaetano Donizetti's La Favorita and Jules Massenet's Werther.

In 1967, she won the Grand Prize and the Golden Medal of the International "George Enescu" Contest in Bucharest, ending her competition itinerary. Already an established name in Romania, she toured France alongside Arta Florescu (in Aida) and made her Chorégies d'Orange debut (as Amneris from Aida). The same year, she auditioned for the first and only time in her career for Sir Georg Solti, who was looking for a Carmen in the London Royal Opera House's new production. Apparently, after hearing Cortez, he declared: "This IS the Carmen we've been looking for. We found HER". Her debut came in 1968 and, although the critics were not unanimously favorable to her, the performances were hailed as one of the season's most notable events. For Cortez, that meant not only the launching in a new dimension of her professional career, but also an encounter with Sandor Gorlinsky, the agent who added her to his star-studded roster.

More capital debuts came. While maintaining a particular relationship with French opera houses (Toulouse, Rouen, Bordeaux, Avignon, Nice) and still a member of the Bucharest Opera, Cortez sang her first performances in Barcelona (Gran Teatre del Liceu, La favorita, 1969), Vienna (Staatsoper, Don Carlo, 1969), Salzburger Festspiele (Carmen, 1969), Naples (Teatro di San Carlo, Norma and Aida opposite Leyla Gencer), and Paris (Grand Opera, Carmen, 1970).

== 1970s ==
By 1970, Cortez was being considered by virtually every major opera house, but for a Romanian artist, getting out of the country was a major challenge, often insurmountable. The lack of a passport and endless difficulties with the authorities were obstacles not only for her, but for every Romanian performer who hoped for an international career. Many contracts were annulled because of this issue. In the winter of 1970, Viorica Cortez was in Naples for a series of performances of Samson et Dalila opposite Mario del Monaco. She did not return to Romania, deciding to continue her artistic destiny abroad and for quite some time was separated from her family members and friends.

Cortez's American debut occurred in 1970. She performed in Philadelphia, Pittsburgh, and New York, where she first appeared alongside Martina Arroyo in Verdi's Messa da Requiem in Carnegie Hall. Both La Scala and the Metropolitan scheduled her, the first in Samson et Dalila, the other in Carmen. In Milan, succeeding Shirley Verrett's Dalila, Cortez was asked by the opera management and conductor Georges Prêtre to consider an extra performance, an exceptional decision of the theatre following the enormous success of her first appearance with the house. In New York, Richard Tucker, her Don Jose for the debut night, hailed her as one of the most attractive and convincing Carmens he had ever sung with.

From then on, Cortez's career included the major opera houses of the world. Claudio Abbado invited her for the Verdi Requiem at La Scala, along with Plácido Domingo and Nicolai Ghiaurov. Ghiaurov was her partner for Massenet's freshly revived opera Don Quichotte, both in Paris and Chicago, the Parisian mise en scène being assigned to Peter Ustinov. In Chicago, Cortez was a commanding and electrifying Elisabetta in Maria Stuarda opposite Montserrat Caballé (1973). The friendship and mutual respect they developed represented a milestone in Cortez's career. For Norma and Maria Stuarda, as well as for Don Carlo and Il Trovatore, they were scheduled together in Lisbon, Naples, Nice, Vienna, Cologne, Madrid and La Scala (Norma, 1974) and at the Met (Il Trovatore, 1973).

In 1972, Cortez sang Amneris at the Arena di Verona opposite the Radames of Franco Corelli. She became a favourite of the audience there.

In 1975, having become a French citizen, she returned to her long-missed Bucharest for a recital at the Atheneum.

Cortez felt at home both in the Italian and French repertoire. She portrayed a rapturous Dalila (Teatro Sao Carlos, Lisbon - 1975, Grand Opera, Paris - 1978), a powerful, intense Azucena (Metropolitan, New York - 1973, 1977, 1978, Grand Opera, Paris - 1975, Staatsoper, Vienna - 1973, 1974, 1976, Teatro alla Scala, Milan - 1978), a fragile Charlotte in Massenet's Werther, almost always with Alfredo Kraus, who named her his "absolute favourite Charlotte", a dramatic Eboli, notably in Vienna, Bordeaux, Lisbon, Bilbao and for the bicentennial of La Scala - 1978, a delicate and interiorised Marguerite in Berlioz's La Damnation de Faust (Paris, Verona), and a sovereign and shining Amneris (La Scala, Milan - 1973, Arena di Verona - 1977, Metropolitan, New York - 1979).

Her repertory widened every year. She was a shockingly tempestuous Klitemnestra in Richard Strauss' Elektra opposite Birgit Nilsson (Rome, 1971). She felt no boundaries or shyness in jumping from one composer to another, mixing Monteverdi (L'Incoronazione di Poppea, Naples, 1976) with Giordano (Fedora, Bologna, 1977), Stravinsky (Oedipus Rex, La Scala, Milan, 1972, 1973, 1980) Mussorgsky (Boris Godunov, Paris, 1980), Rossini (Tancredi, Martina Franca, 1976) and Lalo (Le Roi d'Ys, Nancy, 1979).

== 1980s ==
The many demanding roles that Cortez accepted through the 1970s took their toll. At the beginning of the 1980s, her voice was deteriorating, and her performances were increasingly criticized. She continued singing, sometimes to fulfill contracts that had been signed five years earlier. She was forced to cancel some performances in Avignon and Marseille, and she searched for support besides her family and her vocal trainer. She returned to the stage after a couple of months' recovery, more cautious and more balanced, having decided to abandon the tremendous turmoil of the past. She became quite selective in arranging her schedule. For almost four years, she was rarely in Europe, due to her long-term Metropolitan engagements (Samson et Dalila - 1981, Il Trovatore, Les Contes d'Hoffmann, Adriana Lecouvreur - 1982, 1983, 1984). She starred in some, star-directed productions in Paris (Nabucco, alongside Grace Bumbry and Sherrill Milnes - 1979, Jorge Lavelli's Oedipus Rex - 1979, Joseph Losey's Boris Godunov - 1980 or Sonja Frissell's Un ballo in maschera, alongside José Carreras - 1981).

In 1984, she was a vehement Klitemnestra in Regina Resnik's San Francisco Opera production of Elektra. She sang in Denver, Rio de Janeiro, Madrid, Bagdad, Tokyo, Osaka, and Amsterdam, but she also returned to stages such as L'Arena di Verona (La Gioconda and Aida - 1988), Grand Opera, Paris (Herodias in Richard Strauss' Salome in the fascinating mise-en-scene of her dear Jorge Lavelli), Gran Teatre del Liceu, Barcelona (Il Trovatore, La Gioconda, Les Contes d'Hoffmann, Il Matrimonio Segreto - 1986, 1987, 1988, 1989), Teatro Comunale di Bologna (Un Ballo in maschera with Luciano Pavarotti - 1989). Still in 1989, she awed Paris, this time as La Star in Zygmund Krause's eponymous opera, directed by Jorge Lavelli. The former editor in chief of Opera International, Sergio Segalini, called her "diva assolutta".

== 1990s ==
From the middle of the 1980s, Cortez sang fewer prima donna roles and began taking on the roles of more mature characters. She sang her last Eboli in 1982, her last Giulietta and Dalila in 1987, and her last Amneris in 1988. For a time she alternated signature roles from her past with ones that became landmarks of her later repertoire: La Cieca in La Gioconda (Verona, Barcelona), Madame Flora in Menotti's Medium (Paris, Catania), Zia Principessa in Suor Angelica (Nice, Madrid, Bilbao, Lisbon), La Marquise de Berkenfield in La Fille du Regiment (Torino, Oviedo, Madrid, Monte-Carlo, Strasbourg), Anaide in Leoncavallo's Zaza (Palermo), Ulrica in Un Ballo in maschera (Barcelona, Genova), Madame de Croissy in "Les Dialogues des Carmelites" (Avignon, Vichy), Quickly in "Falstaff" (Bordeaux, Buenos Aires, Hamburg). Her acting abilities, as well as the richness of her voice, made her a sought after mezzo for composition roles (character roles).

Cortez was able to sing in her native country again in the 1990s, after 20 years of exile. She appeared in numerous benefit galas and concerts and gave recitals in Bucharest and Iasi, as well as opera performances ("Carmen" in Iasi - 1991, "Il Trovatore" at the National Opera in Bucharest - 1992).

== 2000s ==
At the beginning of 2001, Cortez and her husband were in a car crash near Iaşi. He was driving when they crashed violently into a tree, killing him and seriously injuring her. After almost six months of recovery, she returned to the stage (La Comtesse de Coigny and Madelon in Giordano's Andrea Chénier in Seville), determined to continue her career. Her comeback was emotionally highlighted by the Spanish press. She concentrated most of the rest of her career in Barcelona, Madrid, Sevilla, and Bilbao, though not neglecting offers from Italy or France. At the Gran Teatre del Liceu, she added to her repertoire a role she had been dreaming of since the 80s: The Old Countess from Tchaikovsky's The Queen of Spades, which she reprised in Madrid (Teatro Real, 2004). She later sang Buryovka in Janáček's Jenůfa in Barcelona (2005), where she also opened the 2007–2008 season as la Comtesse/Madelon. In the same year she returned to the Monte-Carlo Opera (Starenka Buryovka in Janáček's Jenůfa). She also reprised one of her best recent characters, Madame de Croissy in Les Dialogues des Carmelites, for the opening of the 2008–2009 season at Teatro Campoamor in Oviedo, in the famed production by Robert Carsen. The performances were highly acclaimed by the press. Later on, she was to debut with Teatro del Maggio in Florence (Cavalleria rusticana). In 2009, Viorica Cortez starred in the creation of a new opera (Une affaire etrangere) in Montpellier. Cortez is scheduled to return on stage in Cavalleria Rusticana for the 2010–2011 season of the Marseille Opera.

== Carmen ==
"Carmen du siecle" - this is what the French press was headlining in the 1970s. Cortez was one of the most sought-after Carmens of the 1970s and 1980s. She sang the opera 278 times. Since her big Covent Garden break (1968), she relentlessly deepened the character, almost identifying herself with Mérimée's and Bizet's heroine. The critics applauded her creamy, extended voice, ability to cover all three registers, her technique, her refinement in the French way of punctuating, as well as her beauty and charisma on stage. With Carmen, Viorica Cortez entered the exclusive club of opera stars. She sang the role at La Scala (1972, with Giuseppe di Stefano), Metropolitan Opera (1971, 1979), Royal Opera House, Covent Garden (1968, 1969, 1974), Grand Opera, Paris (1970), Staatsoper, Vienna (1970, 1971, 1973, 1976), Arena di Verona (1975, 1980), as well as in Bordeaux, Marseille, Nice, Salzburg, Bilbao, Oviedo, Rome, Trieste, Bologna, Chicago, Naples, Toulouse, Beograd, Piacenza, Rio de Janeiro, Pistoia, Montreal, Lille, Avignon, Málaga, Genova, Philadelphia, Strasbourg, San Antonio, Seattle, Lisbon, Messina, Lausanne, Bucharest, etc. Her last "Carmen" was in her native Iaşi, in 1991.

== Discography ==
Viorica Cortez arrived in Western Europe when all the major recording labels had exclusive contracts with more famous mezzo-sopranos. Thus, Cortez had to content herself with sporadic recordings. The first international one, made for EMI France, was maybe another missed step: Mercedes in Carmen alongside Grace Bumbry, Jon Vickers, Mirella Freni and Kostas Paskalis, under the baton of Rafael Frühbeck de Burgos. By that time, Cortez had already sung the role at Covent Garden and all over France, being a demanded Carmen herself. She then had the chance of recording Azucena in Il Trovatore with Bruno Bartoletti and Maddalena in Rigoletto with Francesco Molinari-Pradelli, both operas being filmed for German television. A celebrated recording was that of Il Cappello di Paglia di Firenze by the world-famous film music composer Nino Rota. In 1977, Cortez recorded in Luxembourg her one and only aria recital, which won the Grand Prize of Académie Lyrique du Disque in France. It was later released as a CD. The lack of official recordings kept Cortez one step behind her illustrious colleagues Fiorenza Cossotto, Grace Bumbry, Shirley Verrett or Elena Obraztsova. Fortunately, the last decade brought a flourishing of in-house live recordings: Oberto, conte di San Bonifacio (Bologna, 1977), Aida (Vienna, 1973, Denver, 1986), Elektra (Rome, 1971), Norma (Naples, 1973, Caracas, 1975), Maria Stuarda (Chicago, 1973), Il trovatore (Paris 1975, New York 1978, 1981), La favorita (Genova, 1976), Don Carlo (Milan, 1978), Adriana Lecouvreur (New York, 1983), Gioconda (Verona, 1988), Suor Angelica (Madrid, 1993), Zaza (Palermo, 1994), La fille du régiment" (Madrid, 1996), Les contes d'Hoffmann (Orange, 2002), Jenůfa (Barcelona, 2005).

== Personal life ==
Viorica Cortez was married three times: first, to the Romanian sculptor Marcel Guguianu, then to the French composer Emmanuel Bondeville, former manager of the Paris Opera and Opéra Comique, and finally to the Romanian-born historian Adolf Armbruster. From the first marriage, the singer has one daughter - Catalina.

== Sources ==
- Adolf Armbruster - "Viorica Cortez. Enciclopedia unei cariere", Editura Enciclopedica, Bucuresti, 1994
- Metropolitan Opera, Viorica Cortez performance record, MetOpera Database
- Alain Pâris, Le dictionnaire des interprètes, Éditions Robert Laffont, 1989. ISBN 2-221-06660-X
