= Eroii de la Rovine =

Eroii de la Rovine ("The Heroes of Rovine") is a one-act opera composed by Nicolae Bretan. The libretto is by Bretan, based on the poem "Scrisoarea III" (Letter III) by Mihai Eminescu, inspired by the Battle of Rovine between Wallachia and the Ottoman Empire. The piece received its world premiere on 24 January 1935 at the Romanian Opera, Cluj, where it was revived in 1987.

== Roles ==
Roles, voice types, premiere cast
Role	Voice type	Premiere cast, 24 January, 1935 Conductor: Miklós Bródy
Mircea the Old	tenor	Octav Arbore
Mihail, his son	baritone	N. Demetrescu
Sultan Baiazid	bass-baritone	Vladimir Siomin
Narrator	heldenbaritone	C. Huhulescu

== Instrumentation ==
The opera is scored as follows:

- 2 flutes, 2 oboes, 2 clarinets, 2 bassoons
- 4 horns, 2 trombones, tuba
- percussion
- harp
- strings

== Synopsis ==
Mircea the Old's rule over Moldavia is threatened by the Ottoman sultan Baiazid. Peace negotiations are fruitless: the sultan demands total surrender and Mircea vows to fight to the death. In the next scene, the chorus describes the ensuing battle, Mircea's victory, and the heroism of Mihail, Mircea's son. The opera ends as Mihail writes a letter to his wife, detailing the army's triumph and promising to return home.
