= Mioara Cortez =

Romanian operatic soprano

- Born: 6 February 1949 (age 77); Iași, Romanian People's Republic
- Education: Ciprian Porumbescu Conservatory
- Occupation: Opera singer (soprano)
- Years active: 1973–present

Mioara Cortez (born 6 February 1949) is a Romanian operatic soprano. She made her debut in 1973, in Desdemona's Otello at Milan's Piccolo Scala. She has performed in Romania and many opera houses in Europe (Paris, Nice, Marseille, Berlin, Athens, Amsterdam, Milan, Bologna, Cagliari, Napoli) and Japan.

== Life and career ==
Born in Iași, in a family with old music traditions, Mioara Cortez is the younger sister of the noted mezzo-soprano Viorica Cortez, and of Ștefania Șerban, a professor of piano. Their father had Spanish ancestry, and their mother was from Bessarabia.

Cortez first studied at the Milan Conservatory (1971–73), then at the Ciprian Porumbescu Conservatory in Bucharest (1973–78). After graduation, she worked with the Iași Philharmonic Orchestra, and as prima donna at the Iași Romanian National Opera. She also taught at the George Enescu University of Arts of Iași.

Mioara Cortez performed in various roles, among others as Norma (Norma (opera)), Poppaea (L'incoronazione di Poppea), Martha (Tiefland), Micaëla (Carmen), Iphigénie (Iphigénie en Tauride), Mimi (La bohème), Amelia (Un ballo in maschera), Leonora (Il trovatore), Leonora (La forza del destino), Elvira (Ernani), Floria Tosca (Tosca), Sister Angelica (Suor Angelica).
