= Paraschiva Iubu =

Romanian architect (1920 – 2011)

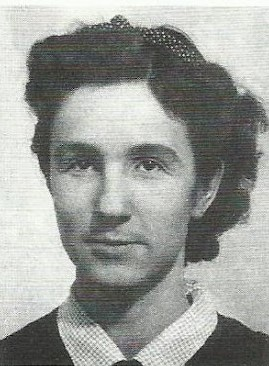
Paraschiva Iubu

Paraschiva Iubu (13 August 1920 – 5 September 2011), also called as Coca Iubu, was a Romanian architect who was active during the 1960s and 1970s. She was an important early member of architect Octav Doicescu's team. Her notable contributions include the Romanian National Opera, Bucharest and the Polytechnic Institute of Bucharest, both were designed in collaboration with Doicescu.

== Biography ==
Paraschiva Iubu was born on 13 August 1920 in Găești, the daughter of Iosif and Elisabeta Iubu. After graduating from the girls' high school in Câmpulung-Muscel, she attended architecture courses at Ion Mincu University of Architecture and Urban Planning, Bucharest, between 1939 and 1944. She also obtained a diploma in architecture in 1947. In October 1944 she joined the Romanian Communist Party. In the 1950s she was investigated by the Securitate for prior ties with the Legionary Movement.

From 1944 to 1947 she worked with different companies, including the Emil Prager enterprise in Furnicoși; the Drogeanu construction enterprise; the Filantropia Hospital; and the aviation center in Băneasa Forest.

Between 1948 and 1953 she worked with Octav Doicescu and others in designing a new theatre for opera and ballet, a construction that was aimed to replace the national theater destroyed during the Luftwaffe bombing of Bucharest on 24 August 1944.

From 1966 to 1976 she also designed the Polytechnic Institute of Bucharest in collaboration with Doicescu. She again played an important role in designing three buildings at the faculties of mechanics, and electrical engineering at the Polytechnic Institute of Bucharest.

In 1954 she was awarded the National Order of Merit by Prime Minister Petru Groza for her works in designing the Romanian National Opera.

She died on 5 September 2011 in Bucharest.
