= Arald (opera) =

Arald is a 1942 Romanian-language 1-act opera by Nicolae Bretan. The libretto, written by the composer, is from Mihai Eminescu's poem "Strigoii" ("The Ghosts"), and tells a darker version of the Orpheus myth. The piece received its belated world premiere on May 12, 1982 at the Romanian Opera, Iași.

== Roles ==
Principal characters
Role	Voice type	World premiere cast Conductor: Corneliu Calistru
The Poet	Bass	D. Nasta
Arald	Tenor	F. Siminic
Maria	Soprano	M. Boga-Verdeș
The Seer	Bass-baritone	D. M. Șuteu

== Instrumentation ==
Arald is scored for the following instruments:

- 2 flutes, 2 oboes, 2 clarinets, 2 bassoons
- 4 horns, 3 trombones, tuba
- timpani
- harp
- strings

== Synopsis ==
A poet sings in prologue, extolling the virtues of the warrior Arald. As the curtain rises, Arald brings the body of his bride, Maria, to the feet of a pagan Seer. He begs him to bring her back to life, pledging his service to the Seer and the pagan gods in return. The Seer summons the elements and invokes Arald's heroic past and his love for Maria, giving Arald a potion that turns him into a ghost. Maria wakes and she and Arald join in song. As the dawn breaks, the two lovers embrace and are swallowed up by the earth, leaving the Seer behind.
