= Romanian National Opera, Bucharest =

Coordinates: 44°26′9″N 26°4′46″E

Romanian National Opera in Bucharest
- Opera Națională București
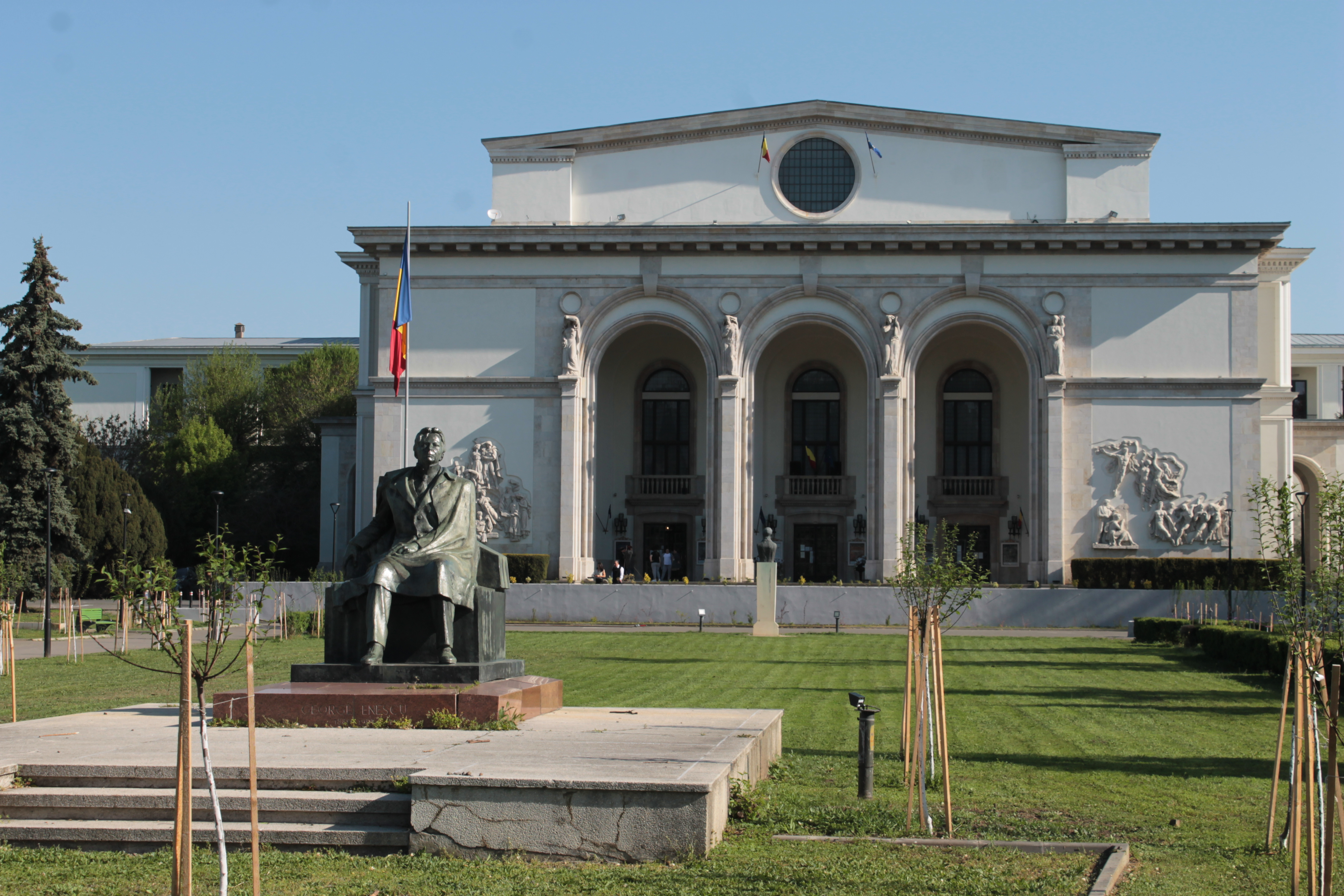
- The Opera house with the statue of George Enescu in front.
- Interactive map of the Romanian National Opera in Bucharest area

General information
- Location: Bucharest, Romania
- Completed: 1953
- Inaugurated: 9 January 1954

Design and construction
- Architects: Octav Doicescu and Paraschiva Iubu

Other information
- Seating capacity: 952

The Romanian National Opera, Bucharest (Romanian: Opera Națională București) is the oldest of the four national opera and ballet companies of Romania. The company was founded in 1885 and is headquartered in Bucharest, near the Cotroceni neighbourhood.

== History ==
In 1877, Romanian government regulation stipulated the formation of an opera company under the auspices of the Romanian National Theatre. On 8 May 1885, the Compania Opera Română (Romanian Opera Company) gave its first performance. The Romanian composer, conductor, singer and teacher George Stephănescu (1843–1925) was the founding director of this company. In 1921, the company was formally established as an independent institution, with subsequent funding that oscillated between direct government funding and funding from private individuals. The first production by the newly formalized company was of Wagner's Lohengrin, conducted by George Enescu.

In 1953, a new theatre for opera and ballet was constructed for two international festivals that occurred in July and August 1953, the Third World Youth Congress, and the fourth World Festival of Youth and Students. This building, with a capacity of 952 seats and designed by Octav Doicescu and Paraschiva Iubu, became the new performance venue for the Romanian Opera. The opera company gave its first performance in this theatre on 9 January 1954, Tchaikovsky's The Queen of Spades. On the next night, the first ballet performance of the company took place at the same theatre, of Coppélia.

The building of the Romanian Opera in Bucharest is listed in the National Register of Historic Monuments.

In the 21st century, musicians and conductors associated with guest appearances, anniversary events, festival productions and special programmes at the Bucharest National Opera have included Angela Gheorghiu, Nelly Miricioiu, Gregory Kunde, Elise Popovici, Giuliano Carella, Ruxandra Donose, Anita Hartig, Ștefan Pop, Erwin Schrott, Elena Moșuc, Nayden Todorov, Jin Wang and Cristian Mandeal, among others.

In 2021, the company marked the centenary of its institutionalization with a new production of Wagner's Lohengrin, directed by Silviu Purcărete, with sets by Dragoș Buhagiar and musical direction by Tiberiu Soare. In July 2021, the company announced the appointment of Eitan Schmeisser as its next artistic director.

== See also ==
- List of concert halls
- List of opera houses
- Opera in Romania
