= Luceafărul (opera) =

Luceafărul is a 1921 Romanian-language opera by Nicolae Bretan based on Mihai Eminescu's long love poem of the same name with text borrowed from several other poems of Eminescu's. The piece premiered in Romanian at the Romanian Opera, Cluj, on February 2, 1921; Bretan's Hungarian translation premiered thirteen days later at the Hungarian Theatre of Cluj.

== Roles ==
Role	Voice type	Romanian world premiere Conductor: Jean Bobescu	Hungarian premiere Conductor: Nicolae Bretan
The Evening Star	Tenor/Baritone	Constantin Pavel	Ruvinszky R.
The Angel Michael	Bass-baritone	Balogh Francisc	Virág L.
King's Daughter	Soprano	Anastasia Dicescu	Lévay I.
Lady-in-Waiting	Mezzo-soprano	Lya Pop	Susnek A.
Voice of the Mariner	Tenor	Gistav Borger Martin	Bakon S.
A Page	Tenor	Traian Grozavescu	Lengyel J.
Chorus of stars

== Instrumentation ==
The piece is scored for orchestra as follows:

- 2 flutes, 1 piccolo, 2 oboes, 1 English horn, 2 clarinets, 2 bassoons
- 4 horns, 3 trumpets, 2 trombones, 1 bass tuba
- 3 timpani, percussion
- harp
- strings

== Synopsis ==
The opera tells the story of the evening star, who falls in love with a mortal princess. He begs God to send him to earth, despite the protestations of the other angels. The princess ultimately chooses to marry another mortal, leaving the evening star condemned to immortality.
