= Cluj-Napoca Central Park =

Park in Cluj-Napoca, Romania

Coordinates: 46°46′09″N 23°34′39″E

Central Park is a large public, urban park in central Cluj-Napoca. It was founded in the 19th century and it located on the southern shore of Someșul Mic River. The Park is now home to the University of Arts and Design and to the Chemistry Faculty of the Babeș-Bolyai University.

On 13 October 1920, the first Cluj derby between CFR and Universitatea which ended with a 8–0 win for CFR took place on a field from the park.

During 2012, the Central Park was site of an important restoration process, especially for the building of the Old Casino.

Every year, the west half of the park is closed off as part of the Untold Festival.

== Gallery ==
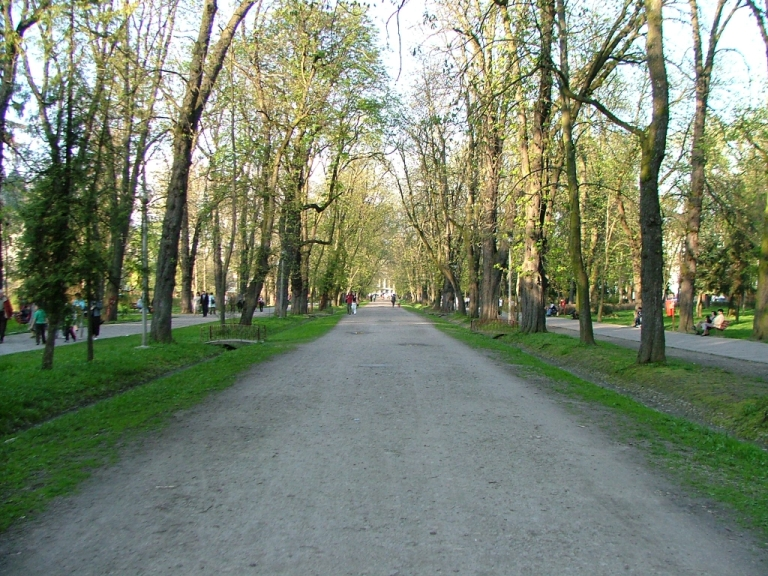
Alley in the Central Park

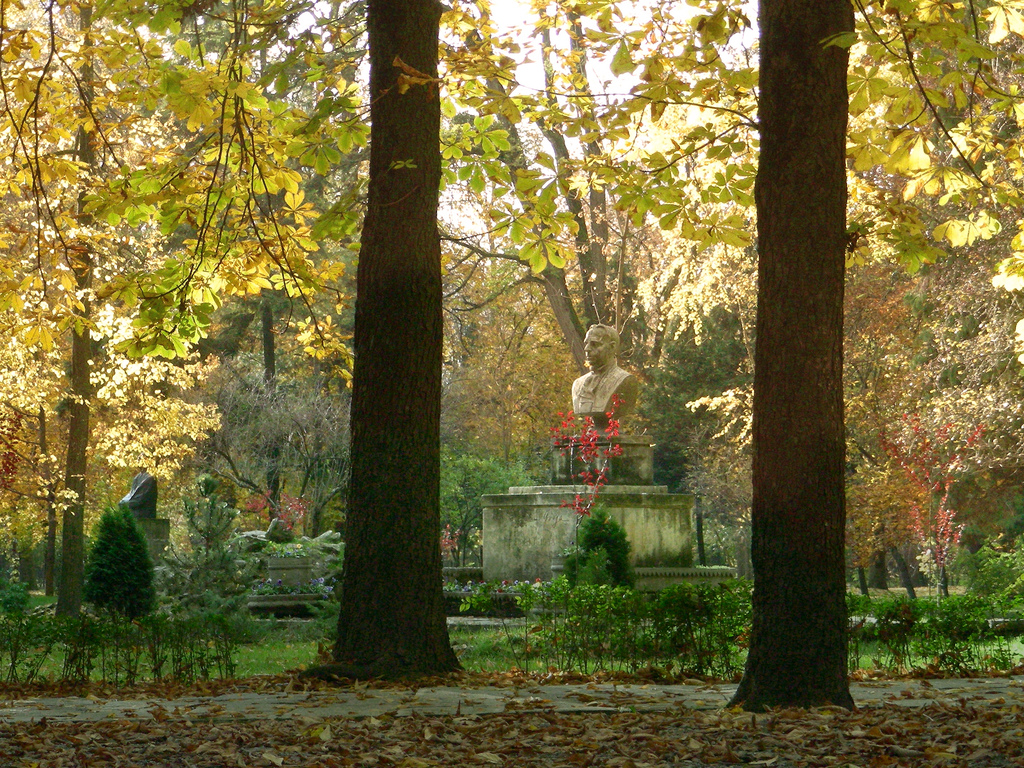
Central Park landscape

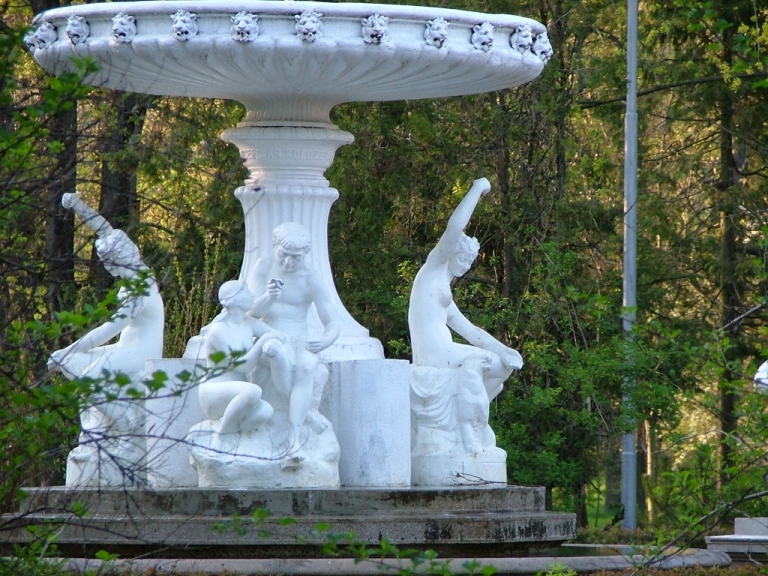
Statuary group in the park

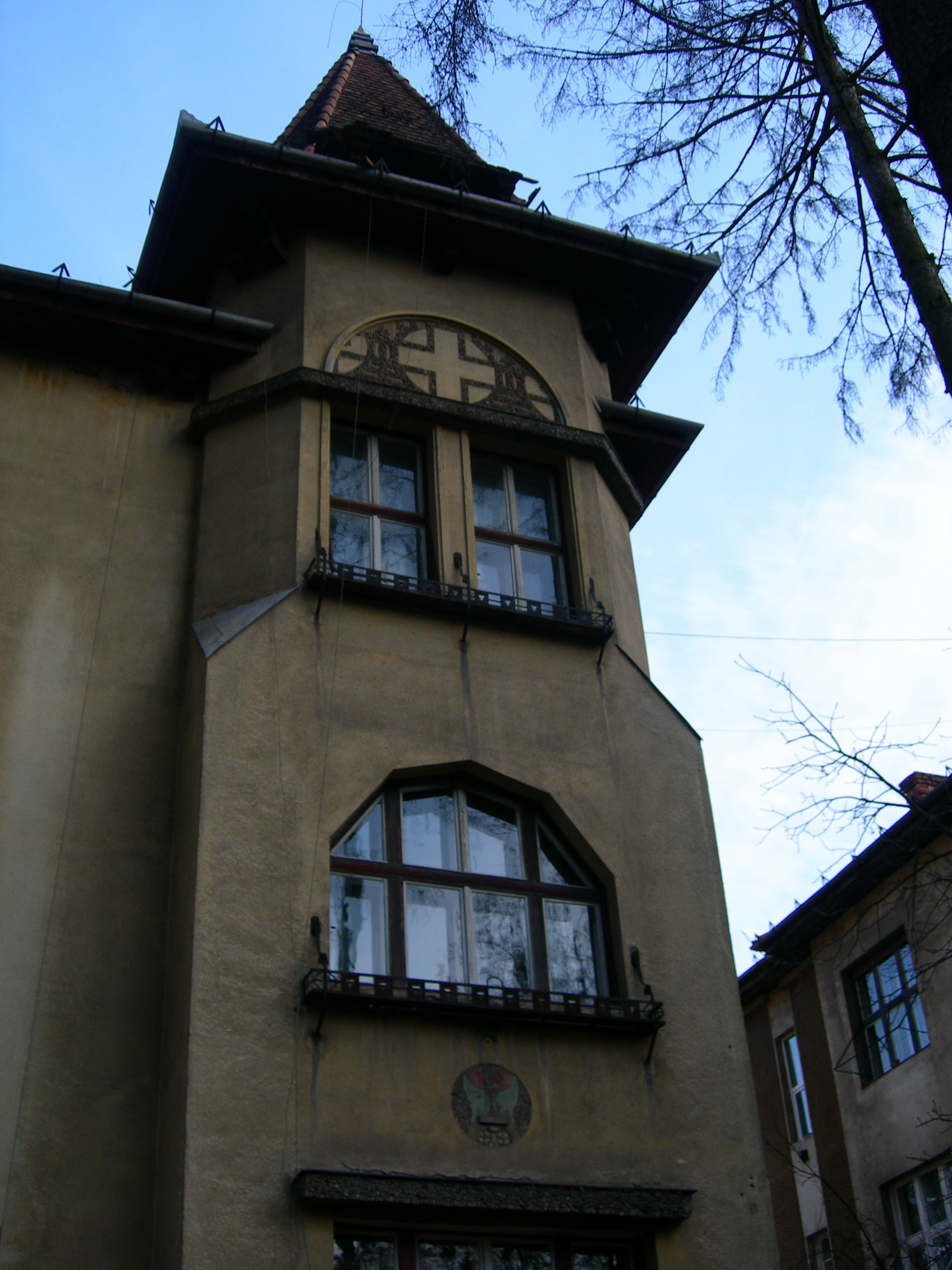
Central Park residence

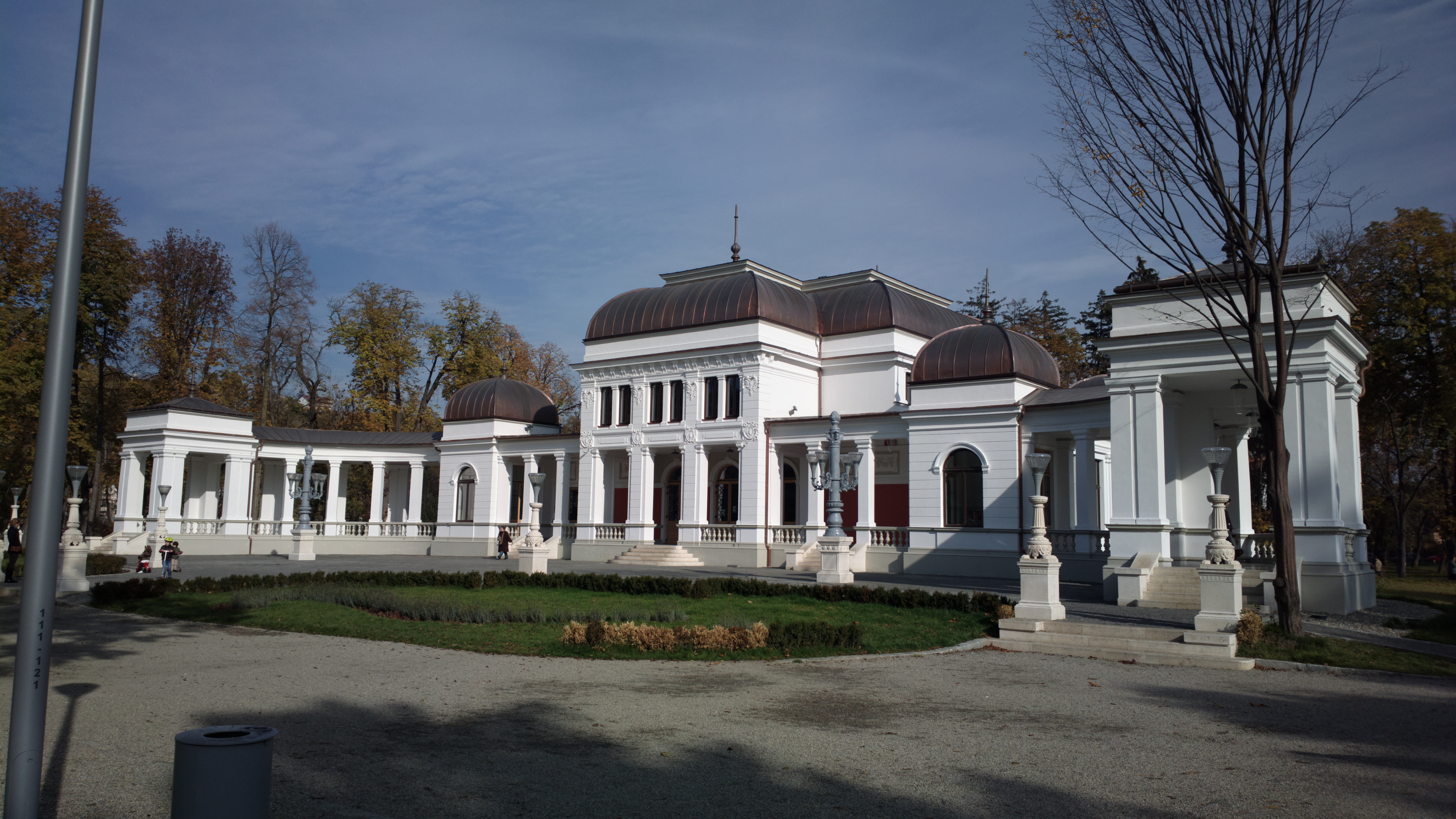
Old Casino Central Park Cluj-Napoca 2012
