= Romanian National Opera, Cluj-Napoca =

National opera and ballet company of Romania

Coordinates: 46.7701°N 23.5975°E

Romanian National Opera in Cluj-Napoca
- Opera Națională Română din Cluj-Napoca
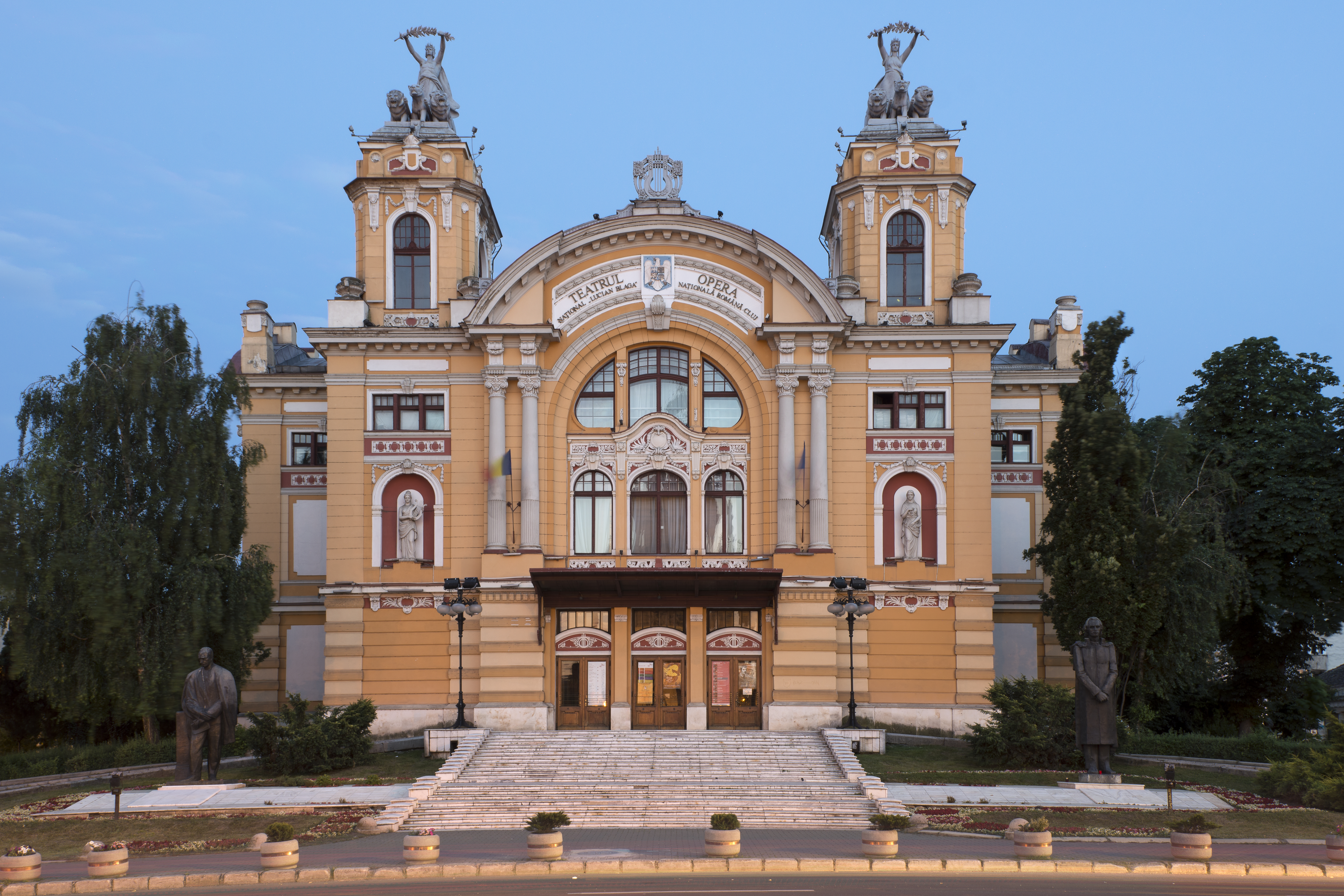
- Front view

General information
- Architectural style: Neo-baroque
- Location: Cluj-Napoca, Romania
- Construction started: 1904
- Completed: 1906

Design and construction
- Architect: Ferdinand Fellner and Hermann Helmer

Other information
- Seating capacity: 928

The Romanian National Opera, Cluj-Napoca (Romanian: Opera Națională Română din Cluj-Napoca) is one of the national opera and ballet companies of Romania. The Opera shares the same building with the National Theatre in Cluj-Napoca.

== History ==
The Romanian Opera was officially opened on 18 September 1919, simultaneously with the National Theatre and the Gheorghe Dima Music Academy. On 13–14 May 1920 the first two performances - 2 symphonic concerts - were conducted there by Czech conductor Oskar Nebdal.

The first opera performance took place on 25 May 1920 with the Romanian version of Giuseppe Verdi's Aida, with Alfred Novak as conductor, and Constantin Pavel as stage director. Famous artists of the early days of the institution include Constantin Pavel, the first director of the institution and the first tenor to sing the role of Radames in the Cluj-Napoca Romanian Opera, Italian conductor Egisto Tango, composer Tiberiu Brediceanu, and baritone Dimitrie Popovici-Bayreuth.

The Romanian Opera managed to establish a prolific artistic team. In its first 2 years (1919–1921), it staged 99 performances, including Giuseppe Verdi's Aida, Charles Gounod's Faust, Giacomo Puccini's Madama Butterfly, Nicolae Bretan's Luceafărul, Pietro Mascagni's Cavalleria rusticana, Richard Wagner's Tannhäuser and 15 symphonic concerts of the Opera's own orchestra.

In 1940, as a result of the Second Vienna Award, the Opera, like other Romanian institutions, had to move to the Romanian part of a divided Transylvania. While the local university moved to Sibiu, the Romanian Opera moved to Timișoara and became Cluj-Napoca Romanian State Opera at Timișoara (Romanian: Opera Româna de Stat din Cluj la Timișoara). In December 1945, at the end of World War II, as Cluj became again part of Romania, the Opera returned to Cluj and restarted its activity.

During its existence, the Cluj-Napoca Romanian Opera staged more than 200 operas, operettas and ballets from all over the world and more than 40 Romanian performance art-forms, including the premieres of George Enescu's Oedipe and Sigismund Toduță's Meșterul Manole.

The Cluj-Napoca Romanian Opera established itself as an important European opera company due to prestigious artistic tours in Italy (more than 22 tours starting from 1971), the Netherlands, France, Germany, Belgium, Luxembourg, Austria, England, Switzerland, Turkey, Bulgaria, Ukraine, and then-Czechoslovakia.

== Building ==
The opera house was built between 1904 and 1906 by the famous Austrian architects Ferdinand Fellner and Hermann Helmer, who designed several theatres and palaces across Europe in the late 19th century and early 20th century, including the theatres in Iași, Oradea, Timișoara and Chernivtsi (Romanian: Cernăuți).

The building opened on 8 September 1906 with Ferenc Herczeg's Bujdosók and until 1919, as Cluj was part of the Kingdom of Hungary, it was home to the local Hungarian National Theatre (Hungarian: Nemzeti Színház).

Since 1919, the building has been home to the local Romanian National Theatre and Romanian Opera, while the local Hungarian Theatre and Opera received the theatre building on Emil Isac street, close to the Central Park and Someșul Mic River.

The hall has a capacity of 928 places, and is conceived in the Neo-baroque style, with some inflexions inspired by Art Nouveau in the decoration of the foyer.

== See also ==
- List of concert halls
- List of opera houses
- Opera in Romania
