= Cluj-Napoca Hungarian Opera =

Romanian opera company

Coordinates: 46.772439°N 23.584067°E

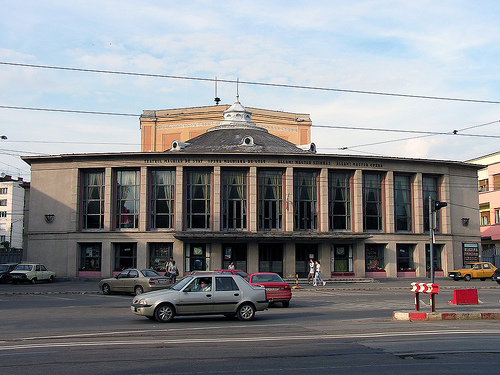
The building of the Hungarian state theatre and opera in Cluj-Napoca

The Cluj-Napoca Hungarian Opera (Hungarian: Kolozsvári Állami Magyar Opera; Romanian: Opera Maghiară din Cluj) is a public opera company in Cluj-Napoca, Romania, founded on 17 December 1948. It resides at the Hungarian Theatre of Cluj.

The structure was built during 1909–1910 on the site of an old summer theatre, and was reconstructed in 1959–1961. The ensemble can host up to 862 people.
