= Romanian National Opera, Iași =

Opera house in Iași, Romania

Coordinates: 47.1632°N 27.5847°E

Romanian National Opera in Iași
- Opera Națională Română din Iași
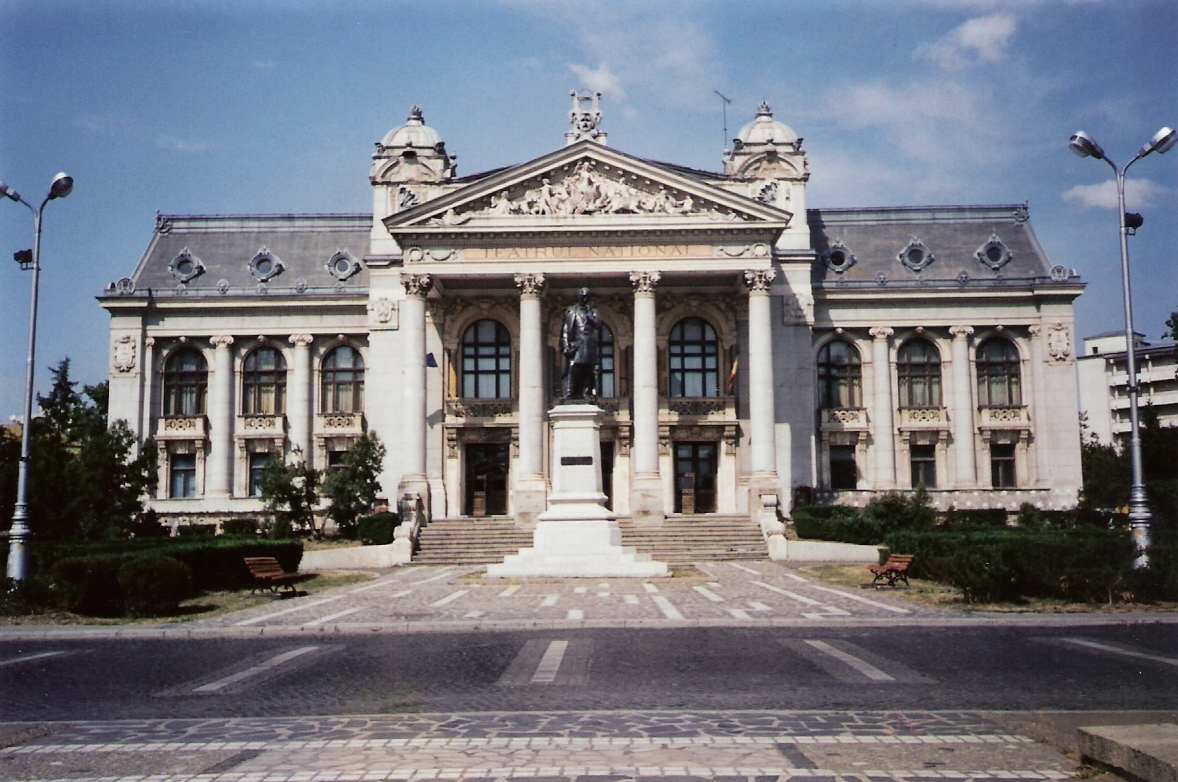
- Front view
- Interactive map of the Romanian National Opera in Iași area

General information
- Architectural style: Neoclassical
- Location: Iași, Romania
- Construction started: 1894
- Completed: 1896

Design and construction
- Architects: Ferdinand Fellner and Hermann Helmer

Other information
- Seating capacity: 750

The Romanian National Opera, Iași (Romanian: Opera Națională Română din Iași) is a public opera and ballet institution in Iași, Romania. It is one of the national opera companies of Romania.

The first performance at the Iași Opera was on 3 November 1956 (the inaugural concert being Tosca by Giacomo Puccini), in the building of the Iași National Theatre, a historic monument that had been built between 1894 and 1896 by the Viennese architects Ferdinand Fellner and Hermann Helmer.

== See also ==
- George Enescu University of Arts of Iaşi
- Iaşi "Moldova" Philharmonic Orchestra
- List of concert halls
- List of opera houses
- Opera in Romania
