= Finham Brook =

River in Warwickshire, England

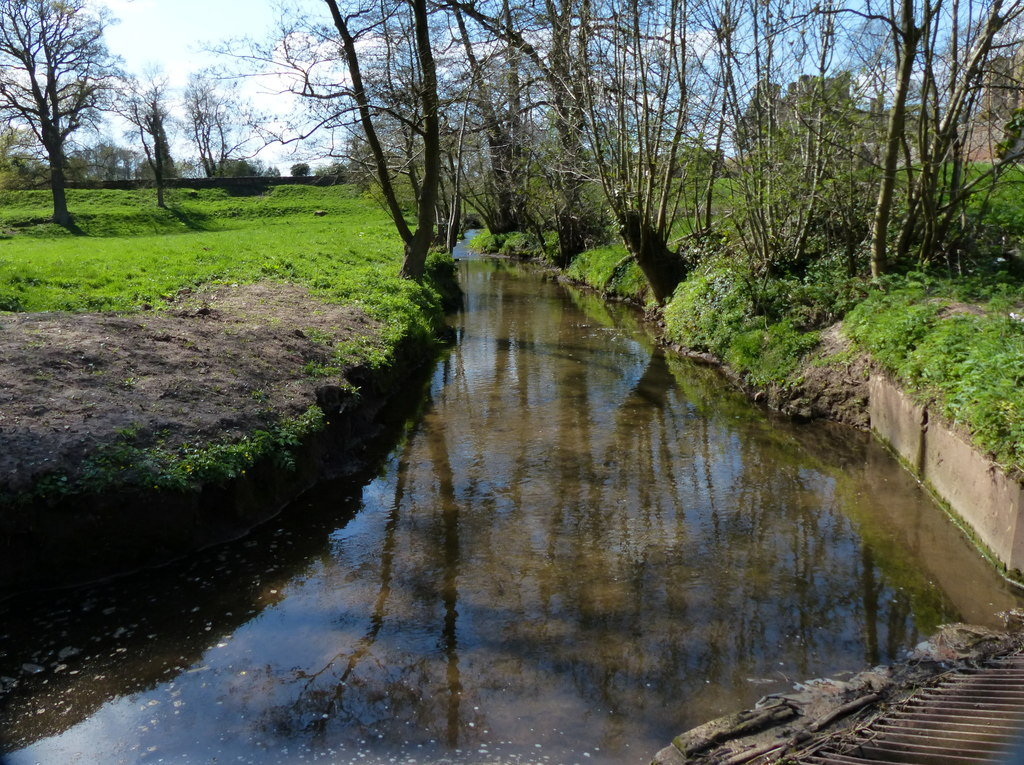
- Finham Brook in Kenilworth

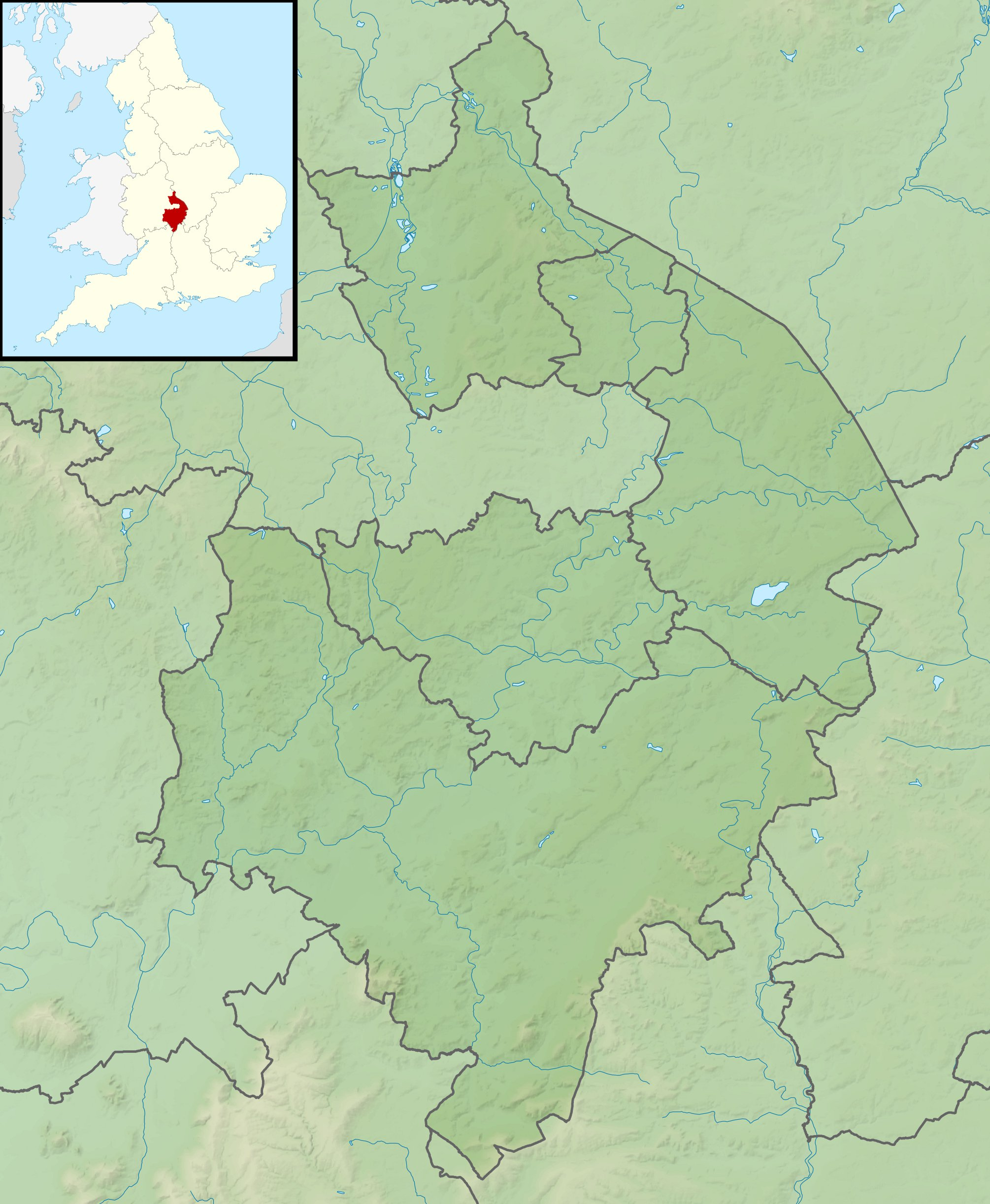
- Location of the mouth within Warwickshire

Location
- Country: England
- Counties: Warwickshire

Physical characteristics
- Mouth
  - location: River Sowe
  - coordinates: 52.3612°N 1.5074°W

The Finham Brook is a lower tributary of the River Sowe, it flows through Kenilworth and Warwickshire, England, to join the Sowe near Finham. Its principal tributaries include the Canley Brook, which drains the Tile Hill and Canley areas of Coventry, and the Inchford Brook which rises near Beausale, and then flows in an arc through the parish of Beausale, Haseley, Honiley and Wroxall. The length of the Finham and Inchford brooks is 15 miles (24 km), which have a total catchment area of 71 square kilometres (27 sq mi).

== Course ==
The brook rises near Burton Green south-west of Coventry, and flows initially in a south-easterly direction, to reach the outskirts of Kenilworth. It joins the Inchford Brook near Kenilworth Castle, where it is crossed by the Tiltyard causeway, beyond which it turns east to flow through Kenilworth. Next to the castle it is crossed by Castle Road via a Kenilworth Ford. In times of high flow this point becomes impassable for vehicles, although pedestrians can cross via the adjacent footbridge. It then flows through Abbey Fields until it is crossed by the A452, and continues through the Mill End area of the town, and alongside the Common to meet the Canley Brook near Crackley. The brook continues in a north-easterly direction, passing beneath the dual carriageway of the A46, to flow through Finham sewage works, to meet the Sowe upstream of Stoneleigh.

== History ==
The Inchford and Finham brooks were dammed by the Tiltyard causeway to create a lake and water defence for Kenilworth Castle, known as the Great Mere, by King John in the 13th century. Its tributary Canley Brook was the site of a medieval watermill, near Crackley.

== Floods ==
Areas of Kenilworth are susceptible from flooding from the brook. A flood warning service exists for the catchment, in conjunction with that for the Sowe, Sherbourne and the Canley Brook. The Kenilworth ford also has a localised warning system using signs to inform drivers when the road is flooded, and when they should use an alternative route.

== Ecology ==
The brook has been assessed under the Water Framework Directive, and has been divided into its upper and lower reaches with a separate assessment for the Canley Brook. All three fall into the moderate category, which is the middle band of the five part framework scale, which ranges from high, good, and moderate, through to poor and finally bad.

== See also ==
- List of rivers of England
