= Talisman Theatre and Arts Centre =

Community Theatre and Arts Centre in Kenilworth, England

Coordinates: 52.34076°N 1.58221°W

The Talisman Theatre and Arts Centre is a community theatre and company located in Kenilworth, Warwickshire, England. The building has a foyer/meeting space, a theatre with 156 seats plus 2 wheelchair spaces and a rehearsal space.

== History ==
The Talisman Theatre began in 1938 when a group of female workers at the Rover Works factory in Coventry started reading scripts during their lunch breaks. This passion led to their first full-length production, "Sixteen," in 1940. The blitz forced them to seek a permanent home and they discovered an old tannery barn in Kenilworth which they transformed into the first Talisman Theatre. The theatre being named after the book by Walter Scott, The Talisman. and celebrating the author's close connection with the town. The theatre opened in 1942 with the play Children to Bless You.

In 1964, the original Talisman Theatre had to make way for the construction of 'Talisman Square'. This led the theatre group to perform in various venues while fundraising and searching for a new space. They eventually secured the site at Barrow road and in 1969, the new Talisman Theatre opened with Trelawny of the Wells. The theatre was expanded in 1975, adding a studio and larger backstage area.

The Talisman Theatre celebrated its 50th anniversary in 1992 and developed the Talisman Youth Theatre in 1997. Despite financial challenges, the theatre continued to thrive, hosting BBC filming for Keeping Up Appearances in 1997. In 2002, the theatre marked their 60th anniversary with the ambitious production A Kenilworth Story.

In 2019, the theatre received planning permission for a £1.3M extension

The theatre faced unprecedented challenges during the COVID-19 pandemic but adapted by producing audio plays under the "Tea With The Tali" initiative.

In December 2021, the Talisman Theatre reopened with their Christmas pantomime, Puss in Boots, though only five performances could take place due to COVID-19 cases.

The Talisman Fringe was introduced in 2022 and that year the theatre celebrated their 80th anniversary with a black-tie event for members together with the stage production of The Railway Children.

In 2023, the theatre enhanced its online offering with a revamped website and finally completed phase 1 of extension plans, enhancing the community foyer area.

== Present Day ==
The theatre produces 9 mainstage shows per year (including a Talisman Youth Theatre performance) and since 2022 has been presenting a Talisman Fringe night at the Holiday Inn, Kenilworth. In June 2023, the Talisman Theatre presented the world Premiere of the stage adaptation of Pride and Prejudice by acclaimed playwright Andrew Davies who is also a patron of the Talisman Theatre.

The theatre is a member of the Little Theatre Guild of Great Britain as well as being affiliated to the National Operatic and Dramatic Association

The Talisman Theatre also has an extensive archive of previous shows and cast and a detailed insight into the backstage workings and set design at the Talisman Theatre was recently published.

The Talisman Theatre and Arts Centre is a registered charity and is listed by Warwick District Council as a Creative Organisation.
