= Abbey Fields =

Park in Kenilworth, England

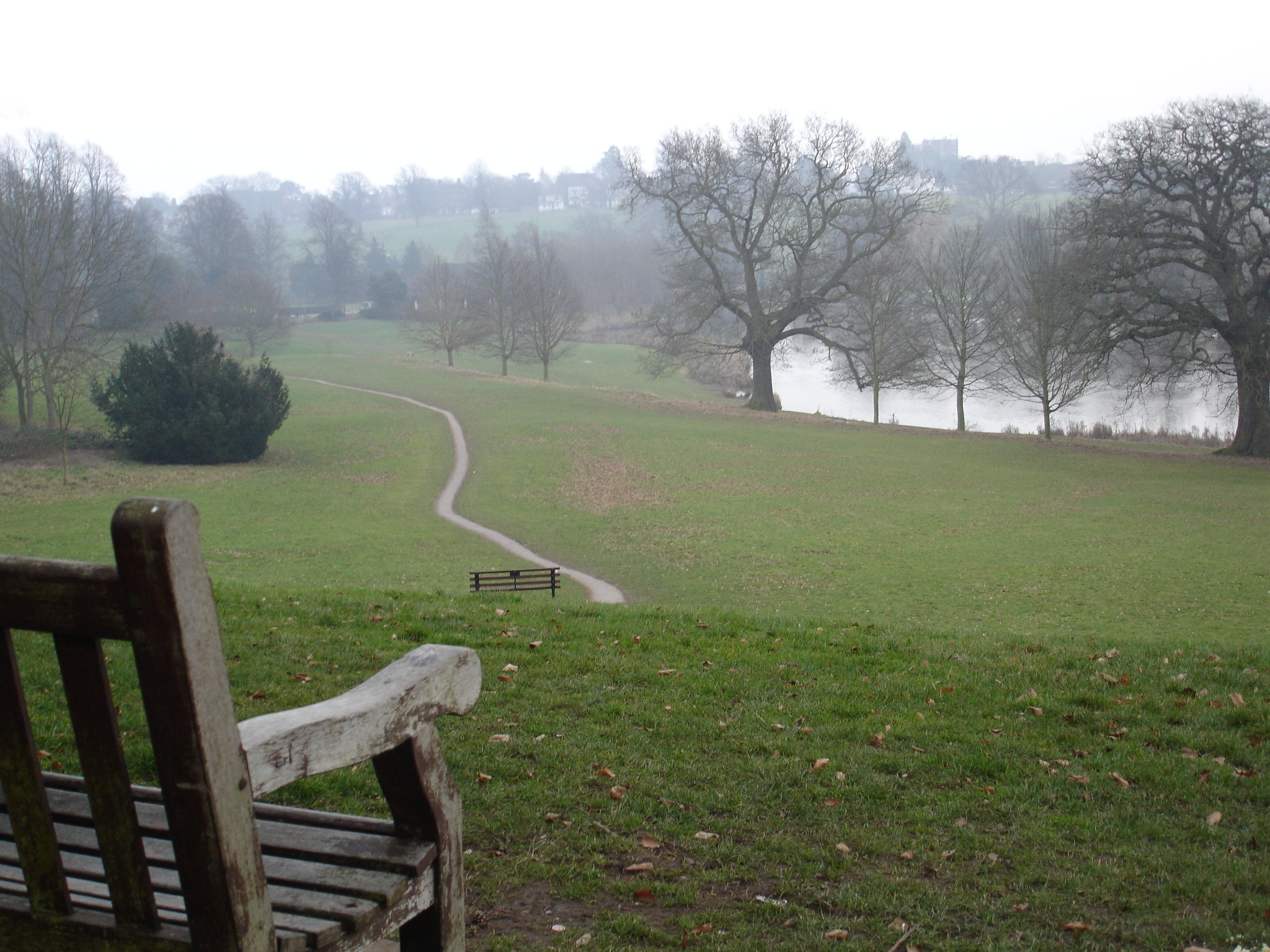
- Interactive map of Abbey Fields
- Type: Public park
- Location: Kenilworth, United Kingdom
- Coordinates: 52.347°N 1.583°W
- Website: https://www.warwickdc.gov.uk/info/20316/abbey_fields

Abbey Fields is a 68-acre (28 ha) park that is found in the centre of Kenilworth, Warwickshire, England. The park was once farmland belonging to St Mary's Abbey, which was dissolved in the middle of the sixteenth century and is now ruined. The ruins include a sandstone gatehouse and "carved stones from the Abbey doors and windows were incorporated into the doorway of the new St Nicholas Church." St Nicholas Church, with origins from the mid sixteenth of seventeenth century, remains in the park.

The park is now maintained by Warwick District Council and has a leisure-centre complex which includes indoor and outdoor swimming pools, five tennis courts and a large play area for children. Other features of the park include a cafe, the town's war memorial, and a museum charting the history of the abbey, located in the old barn. As well as these manmade attractions, there is to be found a natural lake and Finham Brook, a tributary of the River Sowe. The volunteer-run organisation Friends of Abbey Fields works with the district council to maintain the park.

As the largest park in the town, it hosts a number of well-known events each year, such as the Lions Club show, the town carnival, bonfire night events and the Boxing Day charity duck race. It is also an orienteering venue used by the Midlands club Octavian Droobers.
