= Edward Langley Fardon =

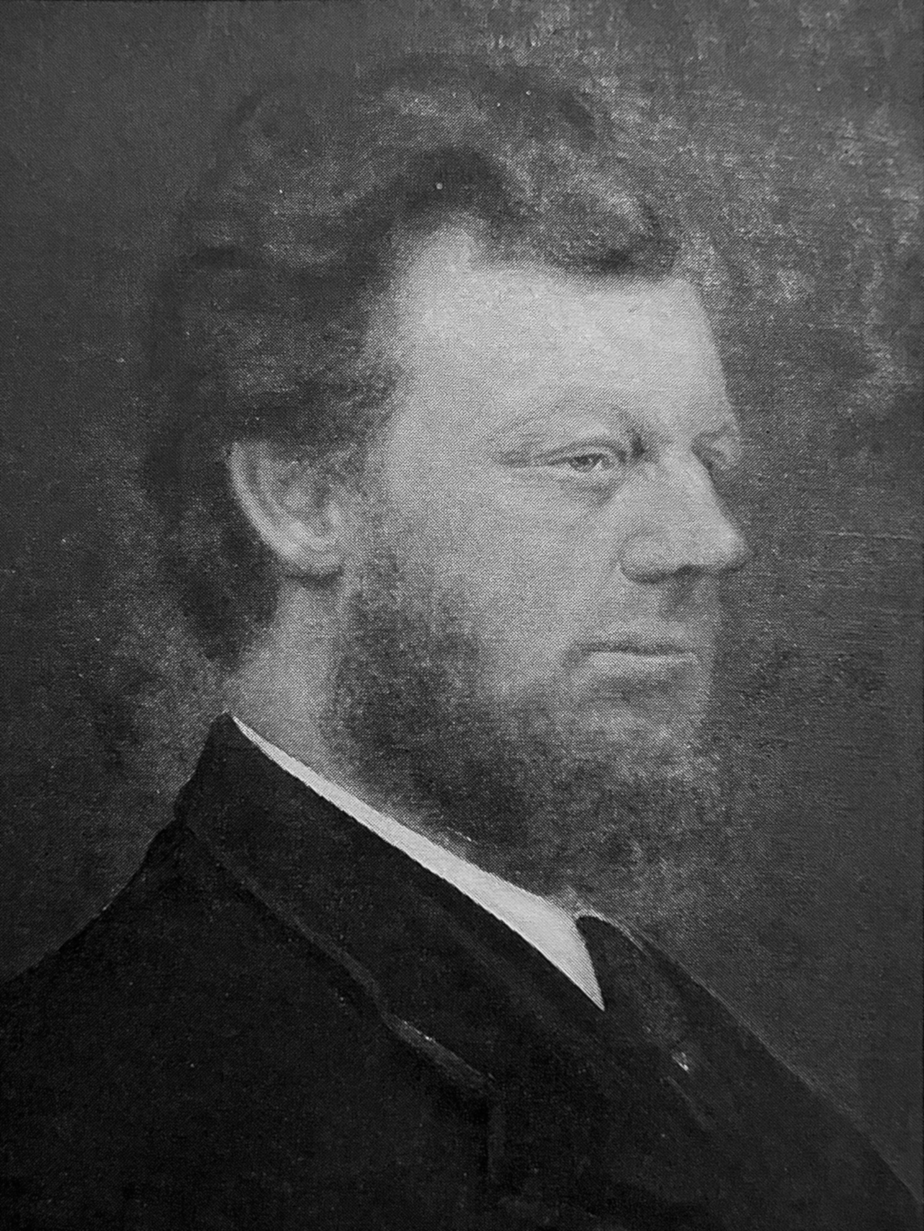
- Portrait of Fardon dated 1910
- Born: 11 December 1839; Royal Leamington Spa, Warwickshire, England
- Died: 9 February 1926 (aged 86); Stoneleigh, Warwickshire, England
- Citizenship: British
- Occupations: Art Metalworker, Whitesmith, Engineer
- Known for: First demonstration of bicycle with wire-spoked wheels and India rubber tyres.
- Spouse: (Mary) Ann Cook (m. 7 September 1862)
- Children: Nine

Edward Langley Fardon (11 December 1839 – 9 February 1926) was an English art metalworker, whitesmith and engineer. He built and demonstrated the world's first all-metal bicycle with India rubber tyres in Kenilworth in 1869, incorporating several new design features.

== Biography ==
Fardon was born in Royal Leamington Spa to James Fardon, a blacksmith, and Mary Langley and was raised in Kenilworth from 1841. He lived and worked in London between 1858 and 1865, and then returned to Kenilworth. In 1873 he moved to nearby Stoneleigh, where he lived and worked until 1926 and was buried there.

== Career ==
Fardon worked at his father's smithy until age 17 when he started at Francis Skidmore's Art-Manufactures Co., in Coventry. Here he would work alongside craftsmen working in metal, whose products were of a high standard, and he was inspired. His interest in design was also nurtured, and added to his craftsmanship, it started him on the road to becoming an artisan. In 1858, Fardon made a 4.5-day walk to London to find employment at larger engineering workshops. He later produced metalwork at chateaus in Switzerland and Paris for Rothschild barons, and ornamental gates at Witley Court for the Earl of Dudley. In 1862, his gates were exhibited at the International Exhibition in London.

Fardon inherited his father's business in 1865 and returned to Kenilworth to rebuild the family's workshop at Castle End.

In later years, Fardon received several commissions on the Stoneleigh Abbey estate and local churches, including hot water and heating systems.

== Bicycle innovations ==
Fardon had seen wooden cycles in Paris and was inspired to improve the principle of the wheels:

I had an idea that they should be in tension, not under compression

— Edward Langley Fardon

In 1868–69, Fardon built his first "velocipede" with an iron frame, handbrake, sprung seat, footrest, and solid india rubber tyres and pedals. The "suspension wheel", as he called them, were constructed of iron rims with 32 under tension steel spokes, in 16 paired positions, at both the rim and the hub, of each wheel. The rear wheel was 18 inches in diameter, and the 42-inch front wheel was larger for a smoother and faster ride. In using the term "suspension wheels" Fardon was ahead of other innovators. Another early term for the wire wheel, "spider wheel", did not come into use until the 1860s and was a very generic term.

Fardon did not apply for patents for his innovations.

In early 1869, Fardon performed a 1.5-mile demonstration ride from Castle End in Kenilworth to Leek Wootton. On later rides into Coventry, crowds gathered to see his bicycle. After six months, he sold the machine for 20 sovereigns (£20) to Stoneleigh Abbey's chef, named Robandry, who took it to Paris.

Coventry went on to become a global leader in bicycle development and manufacturing.
