= Fresh (Coventry & Warwickshire) =

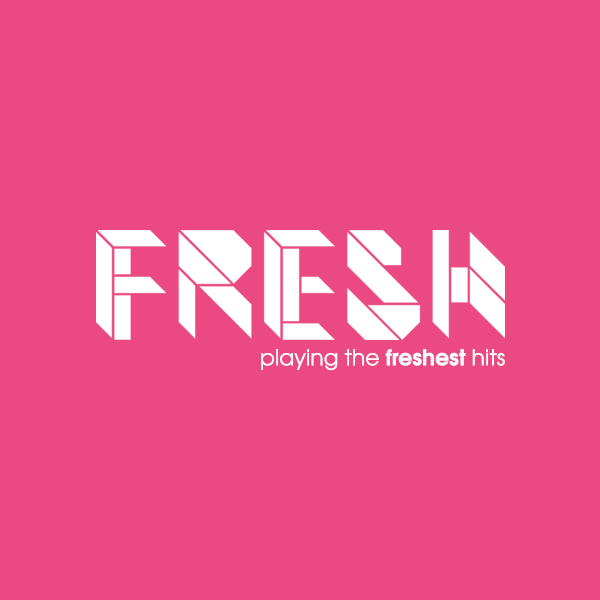

England
- Broadcast area: West Midlands
- Frequency: DAB

Programming
- Format: CHR

Ownership
- Owner: Unmuted Limited

History
- First air date: 28 March 2018

Links
- Website: Fresh West Midlands

Fresh West Midlands is a community radio station covering the West Midlands. Fresh broadcasts from studios in Leamington Spa, Warwickshire, on the Small Scale Birmingham Multiplex and online.

== History ==
The station was initially opened under the name Hit1FM as a hobby radio station in July 2013, by Aaron Gregory. The station was designed to target ages 16–24 living and working in the area, and achieved a listenership of approximately 1000 listeners daily via internet radio. The station spent the first three years of its broadcasting life operating from a bedroom in Coventry. The station then opted to rebrand to Fresh in January 2017 when plans to launch on digital radio were made public. Fresh serves a population of up to 900,000 people in the local area and is run by station manager Aaron Gregory alongside a team of 15 volunteer radio presenters. The station launched on the Coventry DAB multiplex on March 28 at 0800 am with an opening launch sequence.

After being on the Coventry & Warwickshire Multiplex for sometime, the station decided to come off due to a studio move to Kenilworth, Warwickshire.

Fresh maintains a large presence at local events in the community, aiming to link local residents to their community.

Daily programming includes a breakfast show, generally automated programming throughout the day, with presenter-led shows in the evening with a variety of genres.

=== Studios ===
The station moved from original studios in Leamington Spa, Warwickshire, to purpose-built studios in Kenilworth in September 2018. The station has moved to its new home back in Leamington Spa. Purpose-built studios will serve the station in its home of Chapel Court.

=== Ownership ===
The station is currently owned by Unmuted Limited.

== Transmitters ==
=== Digital (DAB) ===
Multiplex	Block	Area
Now Digital Coventry	12D	Barwell, Daventry, Hartshill Quarry, Ilmington, Leamington Spa, Meriden, Samuel Vale, Shilton
Birmingham Small Scale Trial	9A	North Birmimgham

== Slogans ==
- 'Truly Local Radio for Coventry & Warwickshire'
- 'The Freshest Hits For The UK'
- 'Playing The Freshest Hits'
