= St Mary's Abbey, Kenilworth =

Former abbey in Kenilworth, Warwickshire, England

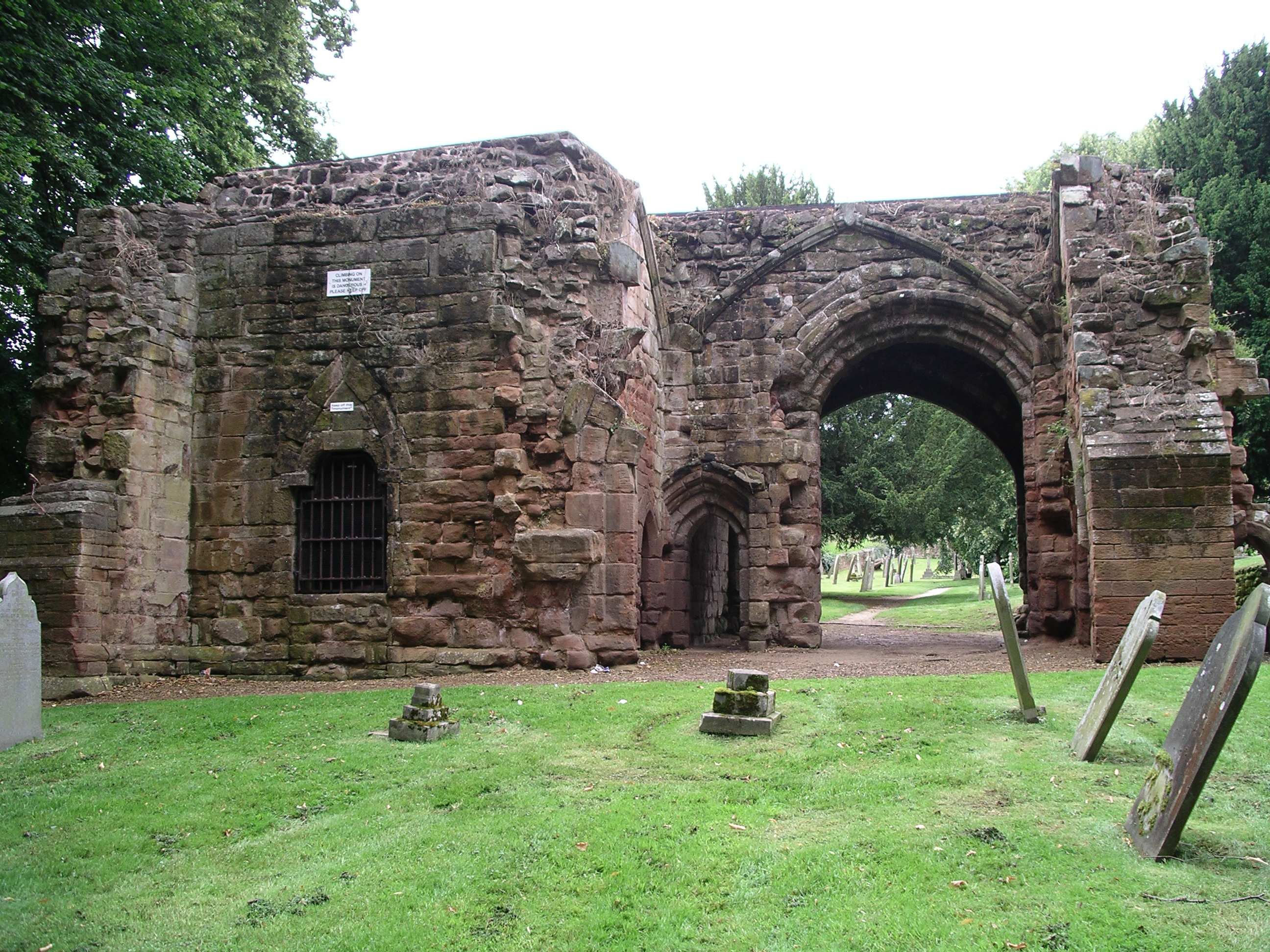
- Ruins of the ancient gatehouse
- Interactive map of St Mary's Abbey, Kenilworth
- Location: Kenilworth, Warwickshire, England
- Coordinates: 52.348550°N 1.583380°W

Listed Building – Grade I
- Official name: Abbey Ruins
- Designated: 1 June 1949
- Reference no.: 1035328

Scheduled monument
- Official name: Kenilworth Abbey
- Designated: 11 August 1923
- Reference no.: 1021079

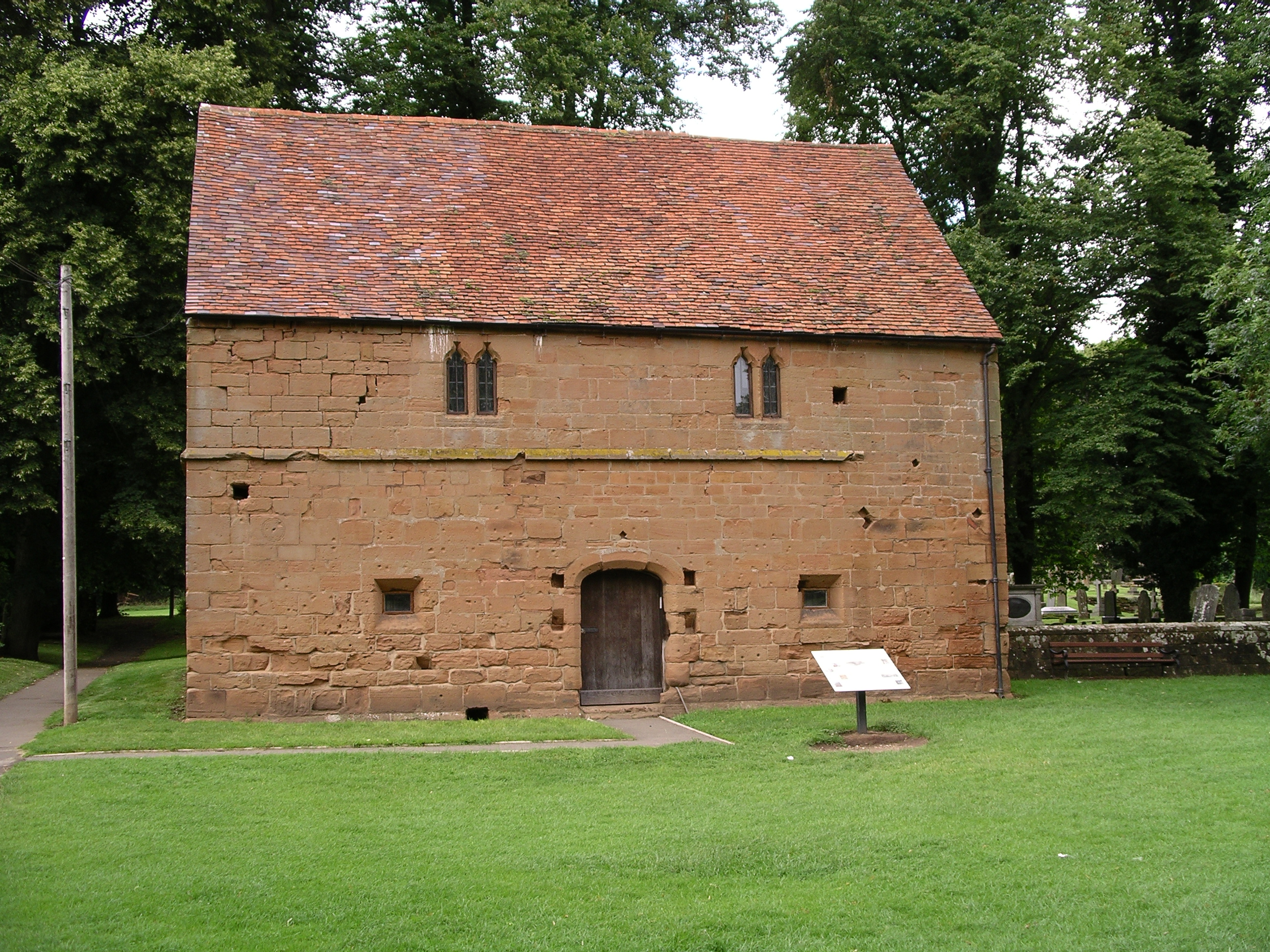
The ancient barn

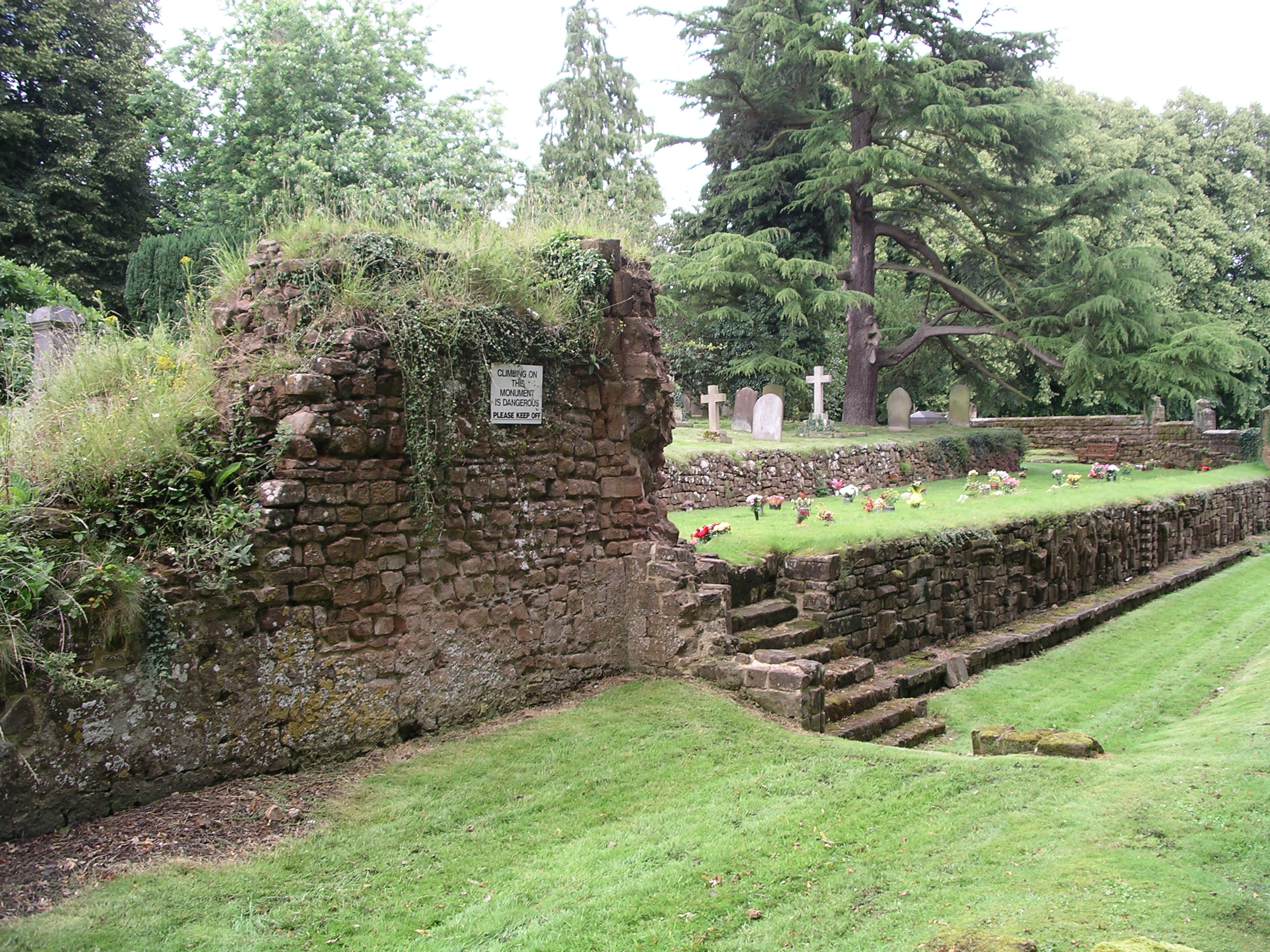
Ruins of the ancient cloisters

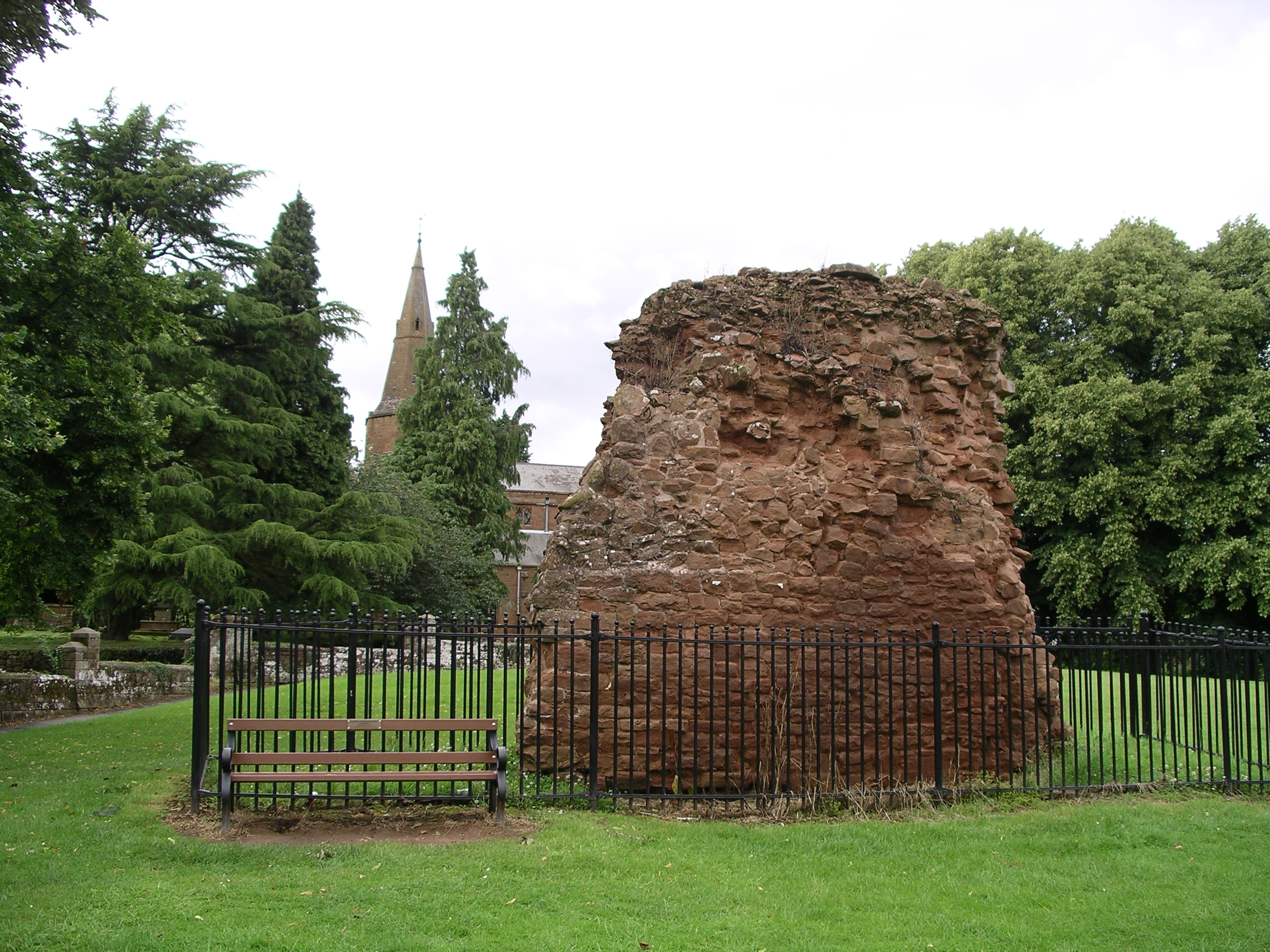
Remains of ancient wall in Abbey Fields

The remains of St Mary's Abbey, of Kenilworth, Warwickshire, England are situated in the grounds of St Nicholas' Church and in an adjacent area of Abbey Fields. Some of its ruins are above ground and some are below ground.

== History ==
A priory for Augustinian canons was founded on this site in 1119 by Geoffrey de Clinton, who also built Kenilworth Castle during the 1120s. Gardens and pools were made near to the priory, and the priory gained additional land as gifts from Geoffrey de Clinton. A barn, a gatehouse, a belltower and an infirmary were subsequently built near to the main buildings of the priory, and St Nicholas's Church was built nearby in about 1291. The priory gradually gained wealth and the Pope upgraded its status to an abbey in 1447. St Mary's Abbey was signed over to King Henry VIII on 15 April 1538 with Abbot Simon Jekys receiving a handsome annual pension of £100 (the prior, John Lister, only received a pension of £8 with the remaining monks receiving between £5 and £7). The abbey was then dismantled as part of the Dissolution of the Monasteries. By about 1700 most of the abbey had become ruins except for the gatehouse and the barn. The ruins were excavated in 1840, 1880 and 1922, and most of the ruins were covered in 1967 for their protection.

In the early 21st century, a scheme funded by local councils and the Heritage Lottery Fund led to an exhibition in the Barn Museum and the placing of a number of plaques in the ground and on walls in the area of the site. The text on the plaques explains the historical significance of these portions of the site.
