= The Water Tower, Kenilworth =

Former water tower in Kenilworth, Warwickshire, England

Coordinates: 52.3524°N 1.5761°W

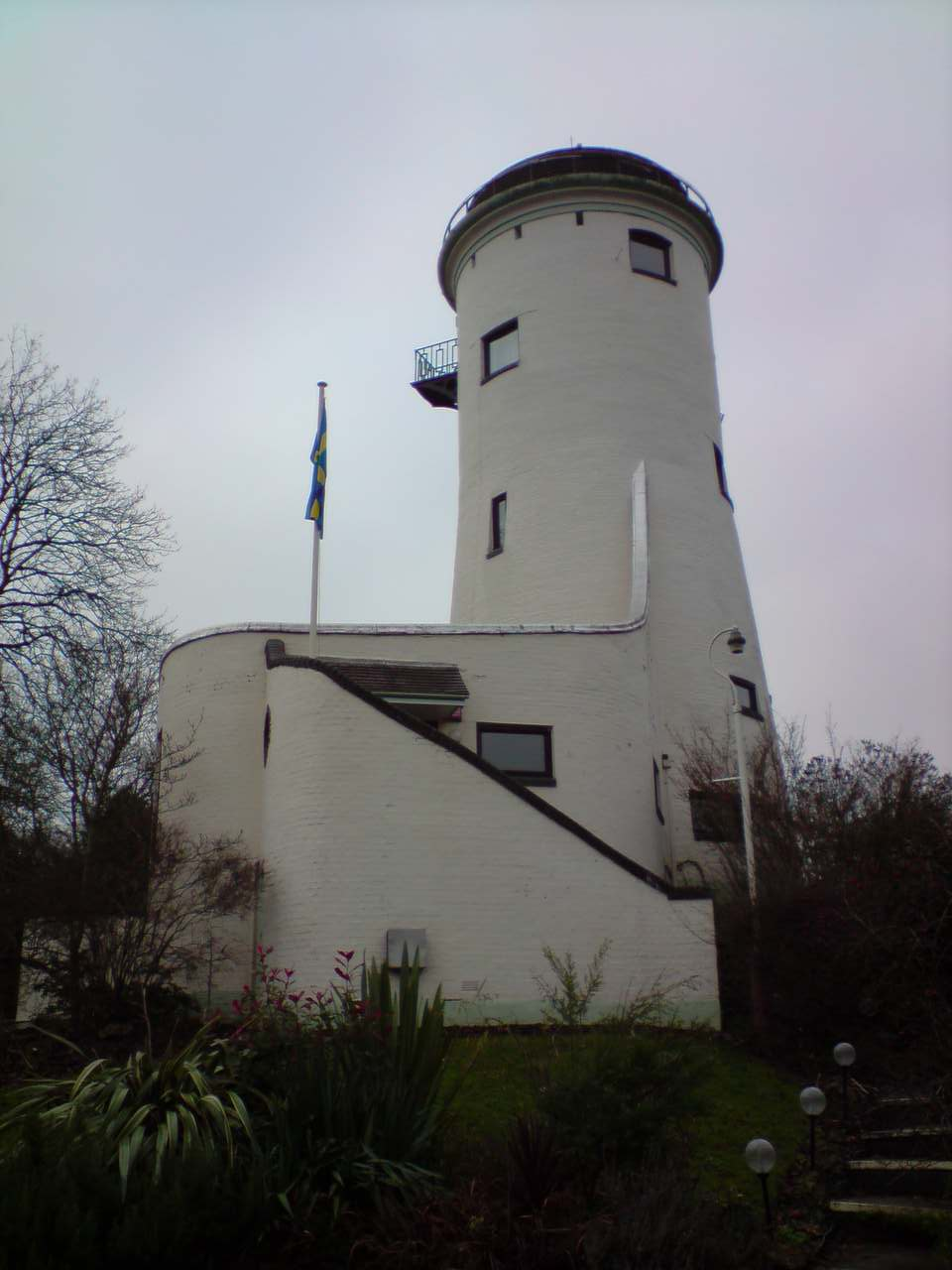
The Water Tower viewed from Tainter's Hill

The Water Tower is a building in Kenilworth, Warwickshire, England. It is understood that the building was constructed as a windmill in the mid-18th century by Joseph Lee of Warwick, described as Gentlemen and John Lamb of Warwick, Haberdasher. There is evidence of a sale in 1778 of the Mill as a going concern. The building continued to be used as a working windmill until 1854 when steam power was introduced. In 1885 the mill machinery was removed and the building converted into a water tower. This involved the doubling of the height of the brickwork and surmounting it with a 26,000-gallon iron tank. This became the town's first Waterworks and provided most of Kenilworth's water supply until 1939. The supply from this tank was in fact in use for auxiliary purposes until approximately 1964. In 1970 Kenilworth Urban District Council, anxious to ensure the preservation of such an important and historic landmark, offered it for sale by tender on condition that it should be sympathetically restored and converted for use as a private dwelling house. Plans submitted by the architect, Mr Edward Byron of Leamington Spa, on behalf of Lt Col Michael Wheat, were accepted and a conversion was commenced in late 1972 and completed in 1974. This imaginative conversion incorporates a new ground floor extension cleverly designed to harmonise with the character. The tower and the whole now forms a unique and comfortable home successfully linking the past with the present.

From the upper floors there are magnificent views over the ancient town of Kenilworth with its famous castle and the tower stands within a few hundred yards of the field known as Parliament Piece where it is reputed Simon De Montfort held the first English Parliament in 1264.

In 1975 the property won an Architectural Heritage Award from the United Kingdom Council for European Architectural Heritage. The award was signed by Philip, Duke of Edinburgh.

A notable tale involving the windmill from the early 19th century is of a brave local, one Jerry O'Hea who showed his fortitude by grabbing a hold of one of the windmill sails. His arm got caught and he was carried round and round until the miller applied the brake.

Previous residents include businessman Stephen Drucker known chiefly for his role in running the Druckers Vienna Patisserie chain, and Gordon Cain a historic buildings surveyor who worked as project manager for the St George's Bloomsbury's restoration.
