= St Nicholas Church, Kenilworth =

Coordinates: 52.3493°N 1.5823°W

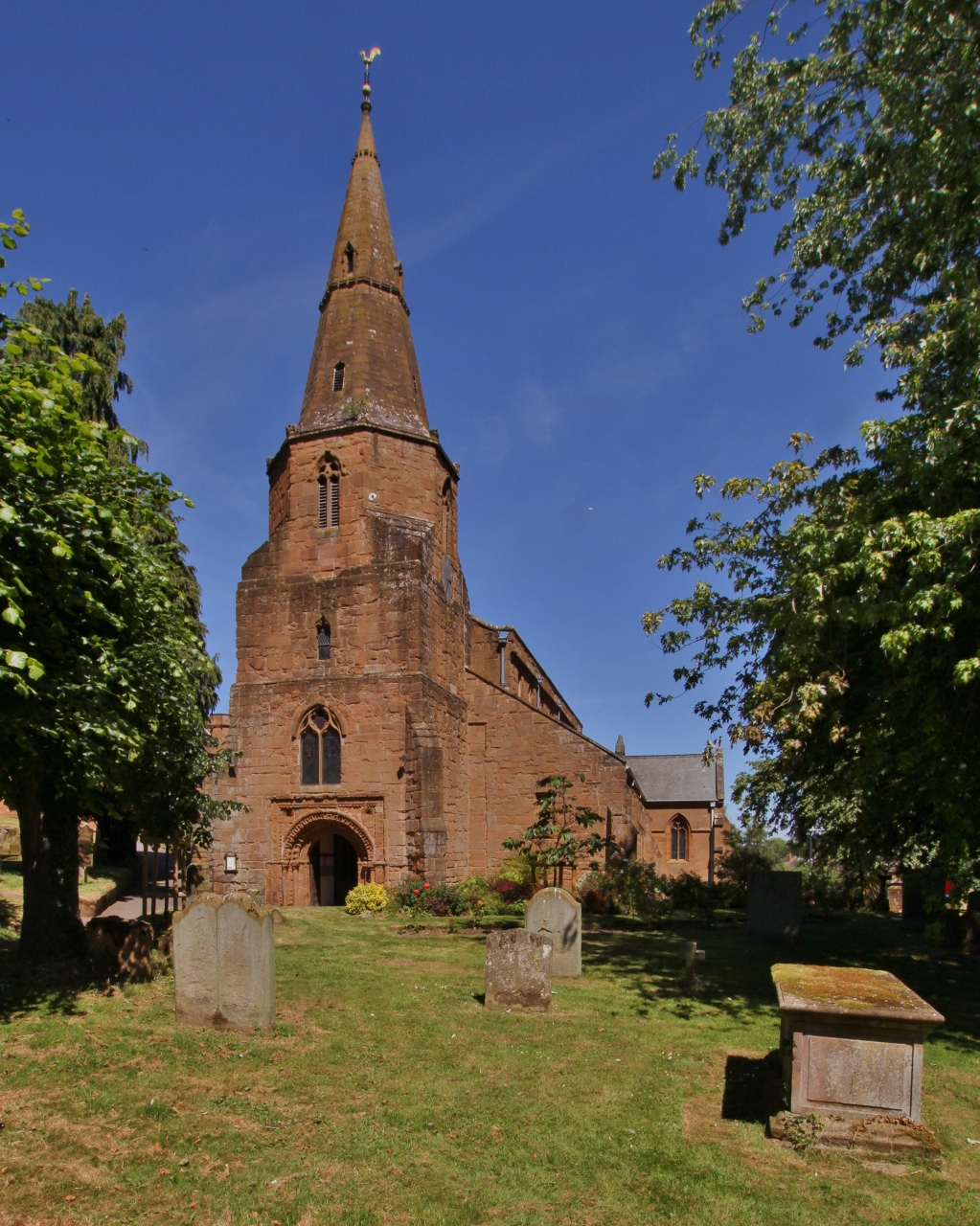
- St Nicholas Church seen from the west
- St Nicholas Church, Kenilworth
- OS grid reference: SP 28562 72446
- Location: Kenilworth, Warwickshire
- Country: England
- Denomination: Church of England
- Previous denomination: Roman Catholic
- Website: St Nicholas Kenilworth

History
- Dedication: Saint Nicholas
- Consecrated: 1 June 1949

Architecture
- Functional status: active
- Architectural type: Church
- Style: Norman, Decorated, Perpendicular, Gothic Revival

Specifications
- Materials: New Red Sandstone

Administration
- Province: Canterbury
- Diocese: Coventry

Listed Building – Grade I
- Official name: Church of St Nicholas
- Designated: 1 June 1949
- Reference no.: 1300415

St Nicholas Church is a Church of England parish church in Kenilworth, Warwickshire, England.

The church is built of local red sandstones. The main phases of building are Decorated Gothic, Perpendicular Gothic and a Gothic Revival Victorian restoration of 1864. It is a Grade I listed building.

The church is a short distance south of the High Street, next to the Norman and Gothic ruins of St Mary's Abbey, over which much of the churchyard of St Nicholas now extends.

== History ==
Kenilworth was part of the parish of Stoneleigh, whose parish church is 3 miles (5 km) to the east. Until a chapel or church was built at Kenilworth, parishioners were required to walk to Stoneleigh every Sunday.

=== Foundation ===
No record of when the parish church was founded is known to survive. Geoffrey de Clinton, who was Chamberlain and Treasurer to King Henry I, founded the Augustinian priory (later abbey) of St Mary the Virgin in 1119 and Kenilworth Castle in the early 1120s. About the same time Clinton founded a borough of Kenilworth and a deer park, but there is no record of a parish church for local laity being founded at the same time.

A tax record from AD 1210 notes a chapel in Kenilworth paying a tithe. But there is no record of where that chapel was or what congregation it served. A pair of sandstone cottages, 12 and 13 Castle Green, are the remains of a former more important building. Their orientation and thick walls are consistent with a Norman chapel, and there is even a Mass dial, but there is no proof that these cottages are the chapel recorded in 1210.

Building a parish church for laity next to an abbey church is a common arrangement. St Margaret's, Westminster next to Westminster Abbey is a well-known example. Just as Westminster Abbey held the advowson of St Margaret's, so Kenilworth Priory held that of the parish of St Nicholas.

One of the earliest pieces of masonry in the church of St Nicholas is the base of the font. This is Norman, and therefore predates the late 12th century. The square lower stages of the west tower have massive walls which could also be Norman. But that is conjecture.

The earliest known written evidence of a church for laity at Kenilworth is in the Registers of Godfrey Giffard, Bishop of Worcester, which record a "parson of the church at Kenilworth" in 1285. Pope Nicholas IV's taxation list of 1291 also records the church. It is therefore possible that the church of St Nicholas may have been founded in the 13th century, after 1210 and before 1285.

=== Expansion ===
The original church may have consisted of only a nave and chancel. In the chancel are Decorated Gothic sedilia, which may indicate a phase of building between about 1275 and 1380. In the 14th century the nave was widened by the addition of a south aisles with an arcade of five bays. The octagonal belfry and spire of the west tower are also 14th-century Decorated Gothic.

Later in the 14th century the nave was widened again with the addition of a north aisle with Perpendicular Gothic windows plus a northwest porch. The arcade of the north aisle is of only three bays, with the porch occupying the fourth bay. Also Perpendicular Gothic is the clerestory that was added to the nave.

There is a squint just south of the chancel arch, providing a line of sight from the south side of the nave to the chancel. Many squints in Mediæval churches were to allow a priest at a side altar to see the high altar in the chancel. However, position of the squint in this church suggests it may have been for a bellringer to see when to ring a Sanctus bell which would have been in a bell-gable outside above the chancel arch.

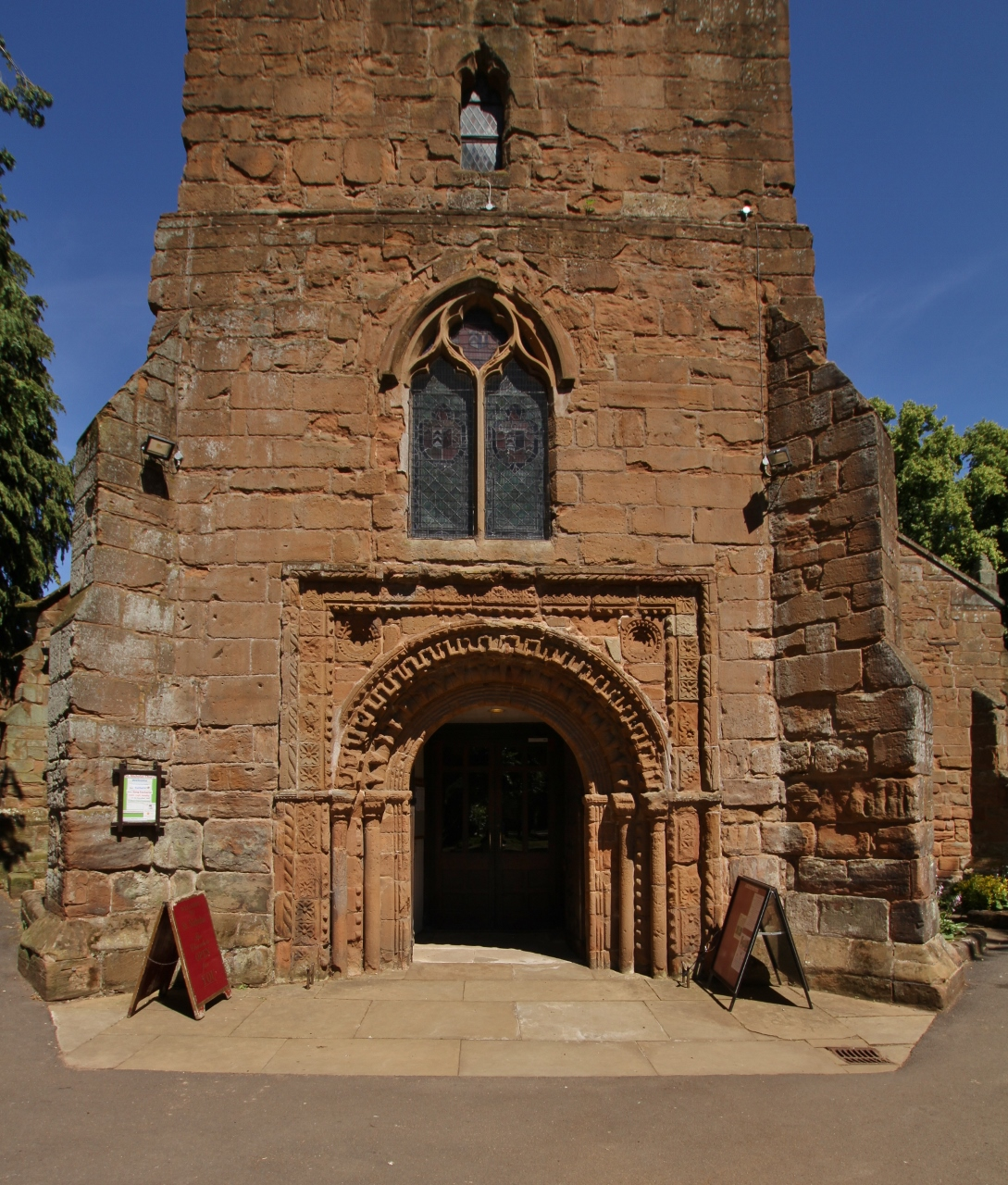
Lower stages of the west tower, showing the re-set Norman west portal below a Decorated Gothic window

St Mary's priory was under royal patronage by early in the 13th century and was made an abbey in 1458. But in the Dissolution of the Monasteries it surrendered to The Crown in 1538. The Crown subsequently sold much of the abbey's estate, but it retained the advowson of the parish of St Nicholas.

=== Alterations after the Reformation ===
The abbey was largely demolished by 1547. In the demolition some architectural fragments were salvaged from the abbey and incorporated into the parish church. Most notable of these is the Norman west portal in the west tower, which Nikolaus Pevsner and Alexandra Wedgwood called "the most sumptuous Norman doorway in Warwickshire". This doorway may in fact be a composite, created in the 16th century from elements of more than one doorway of the demolished abbey.

Workmen demolishing the abbey melted down the lead from the roof to make "pigs" or "fothers" to be taken away. One such "pig" was lost until 1888, when it was found in the ruins. It bears the stamp of King Henry VIII's Commissioners. It is now displayed in the northeast corner of the chancel. In 1922 an archæological excavation of the abbey site found the sand-moulds for casting the pigs.

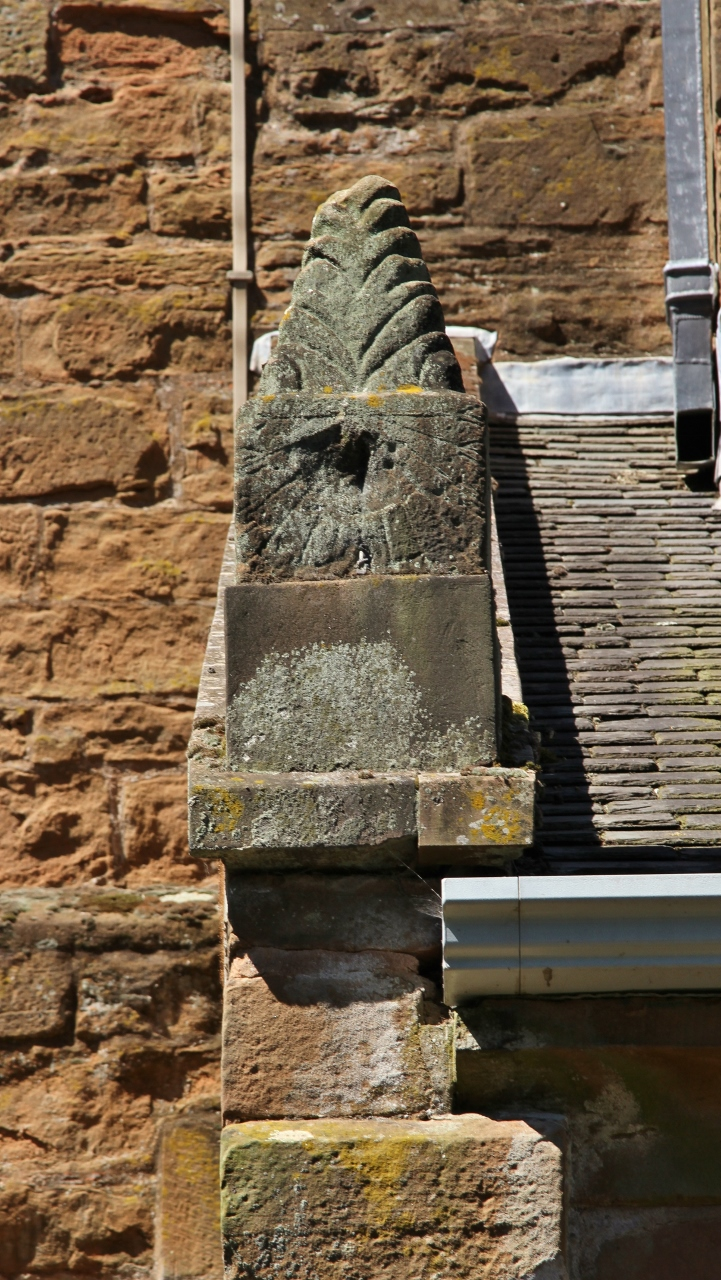
Stone sundial at the west end of the south aisle

The nave had a steeply pitched roof until 1580, when Robert Dudley, 1st Earl of Leicester had it lowered to its present shallow pitch. The line of the earlier roof survives as a trace on the east side of the tower. The chancel roof was taken down and relaid in 1692 under the auspices of the then Vicar, William Best, at a cost of £80.

Although the base of the font is Norman, the stem and bowl are later. They were made in 1664, to replace one that seems to have been broken in the English Civil War.

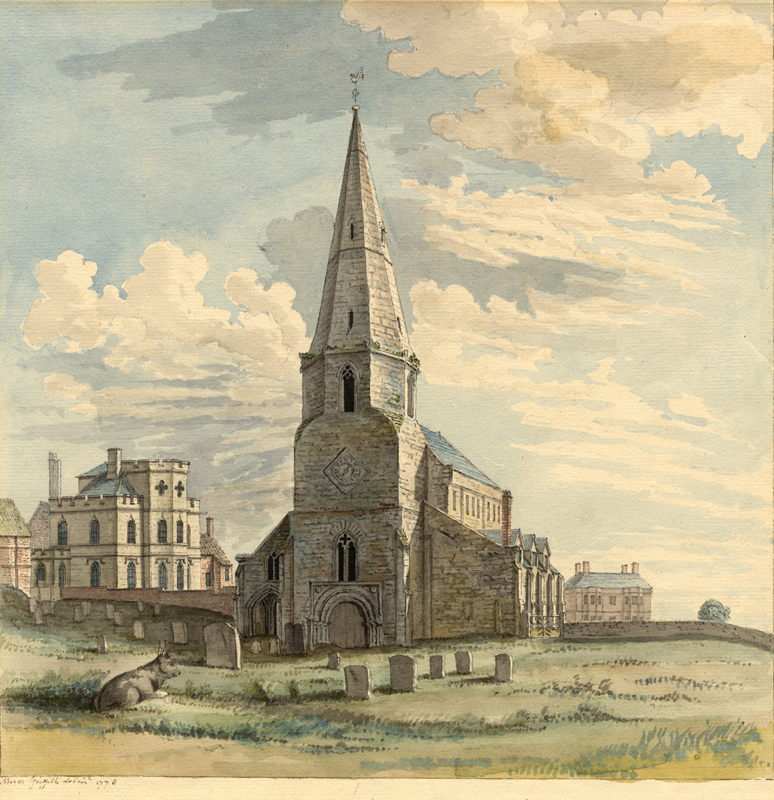
1776 watercolour of St Nicholas Church and (left) Bank House, seen from the west

In the 18th century galleries were added to the nave and aisles to increase seating capacity. A gallery in the north aisle was added in 1751, followed by one in the south aisle in 1760. No record survives of when the west gallery for church musicians was added, but it is known to have existed by 1772. All three galleries were removed in 1850. Two years later a second Anglican church for Kenilworth, that of St John the Evangelist, was completed on the south side of the town, relieving the crowding of St Nicholas'.

=== Gothic Revival restorations ===
In 1858 lightning struck and damaged the spire, which thereafter was "entirely rebuilt".

In 1775 a three-decker pulpit had been installed in St Nicholas Church. It stood in the chancel arch, which impeded the congregation's view of the altar. Rev William Bickmore, who was Vicar 1855–75, had it removed in 1860. Also under Bickmore the church was "drastically" restored in 1864–65. A painting of the interior before the restoration shows the gallery in the south arcade and the old pulpit in the chancel arch. It shows also that the chancel arch was round-headed, and therefore Norman. Bickmore's restoration included removing this arch and replacing it with a Gothic Revival one to conform with the north and south arcades.

The pre-restoration painting shows also a flat ceiling in the nave. There was a similar ceiling in the chancel. Bickmore's restoration removed these ceilings.

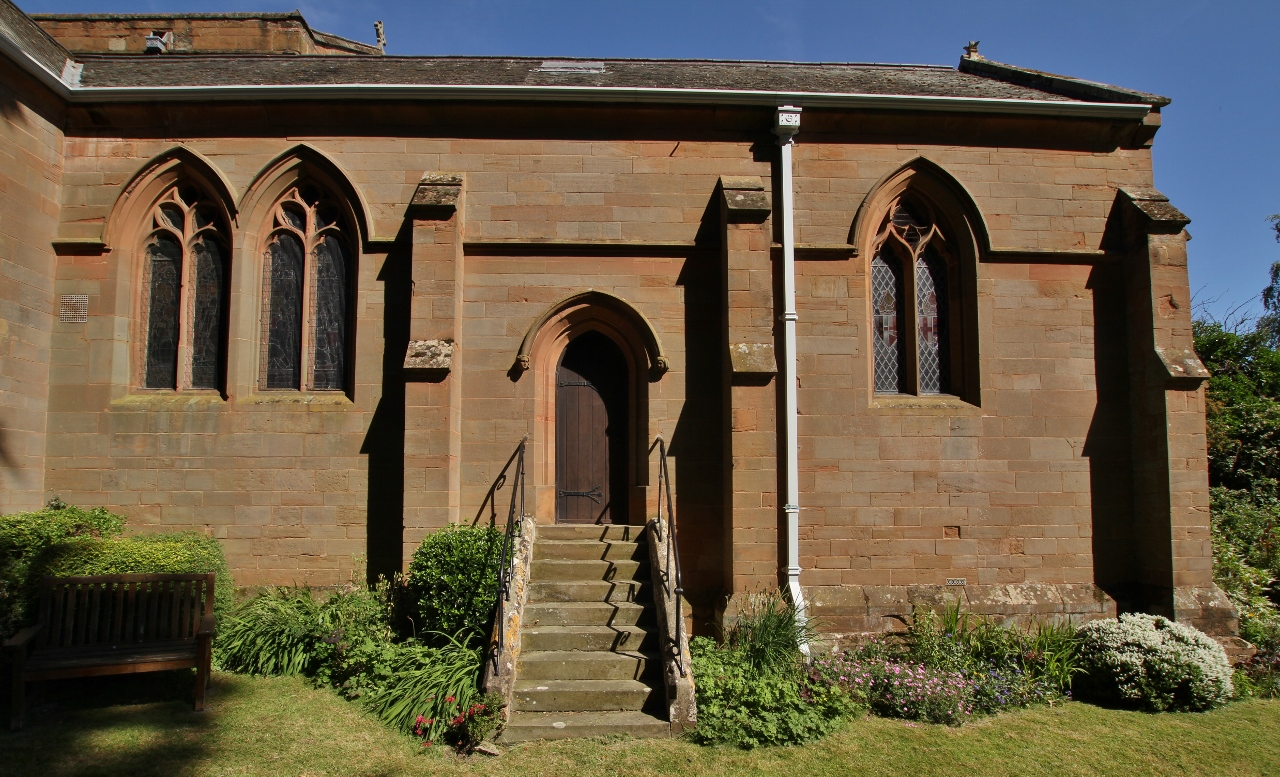
South side of what is now the Lady chapel, built in 1864

The chancel was extended eastward and a two-bay aisle was added to its south side, originally to increase seating for the congregation in main services. The north aisle was extended eastward by one bay to create an organ loft, to which a vestry was attached. The south aisle was rebuilt, with new Gothic Revival windows matching the new aisle south of the chancel. The easternmost bay of the south aisle was extended southward to form a south transept. However, the south window of the south transept is older, with heraldic stained glass made in 1832. Sources disagree as to the date of the three-light east window in the chancel. It was inserted in either 1867 or 1876.

Until the 16th century a rood screen occupied the chancel arch. It had a gallery, which was reached via a flight of stairs at the northwest corner of the chancel. It was removed in the Reformation. In 1913 a Gothic Revival chancel screen was inserted, but without a rood. In 1918 the south aisle of the chancel was reordered to form a Lady chapel.

== Features ==
=== Notable monuments ===
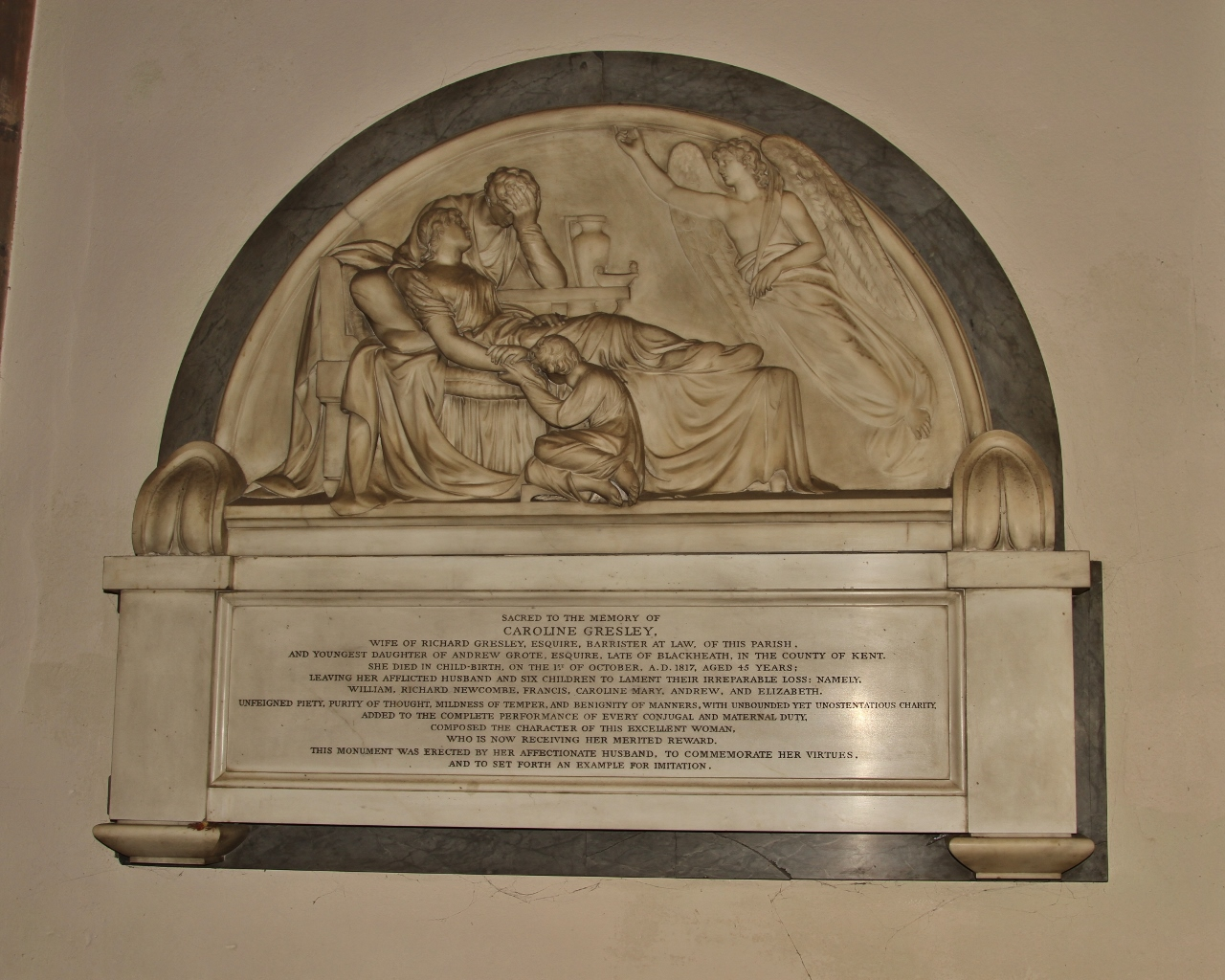
Monument by Richard Westmacott to Caroline Gresley, who died in 1817

The most notable monuments in the church are wall-mounted Neoclassical marble reliefs. Joseph Nollekens (1737–1823) sculpted a putto leaning on a funerary urn to commemorate John Bird, who died in 1772. Richard Westmacott sculpted a relief of Caroline Gresley, who died in 1817. He shows her reclining on her deathbed, surrounded by her grieving family, as an angel hovers at the foot.

=== Bells and clock ===
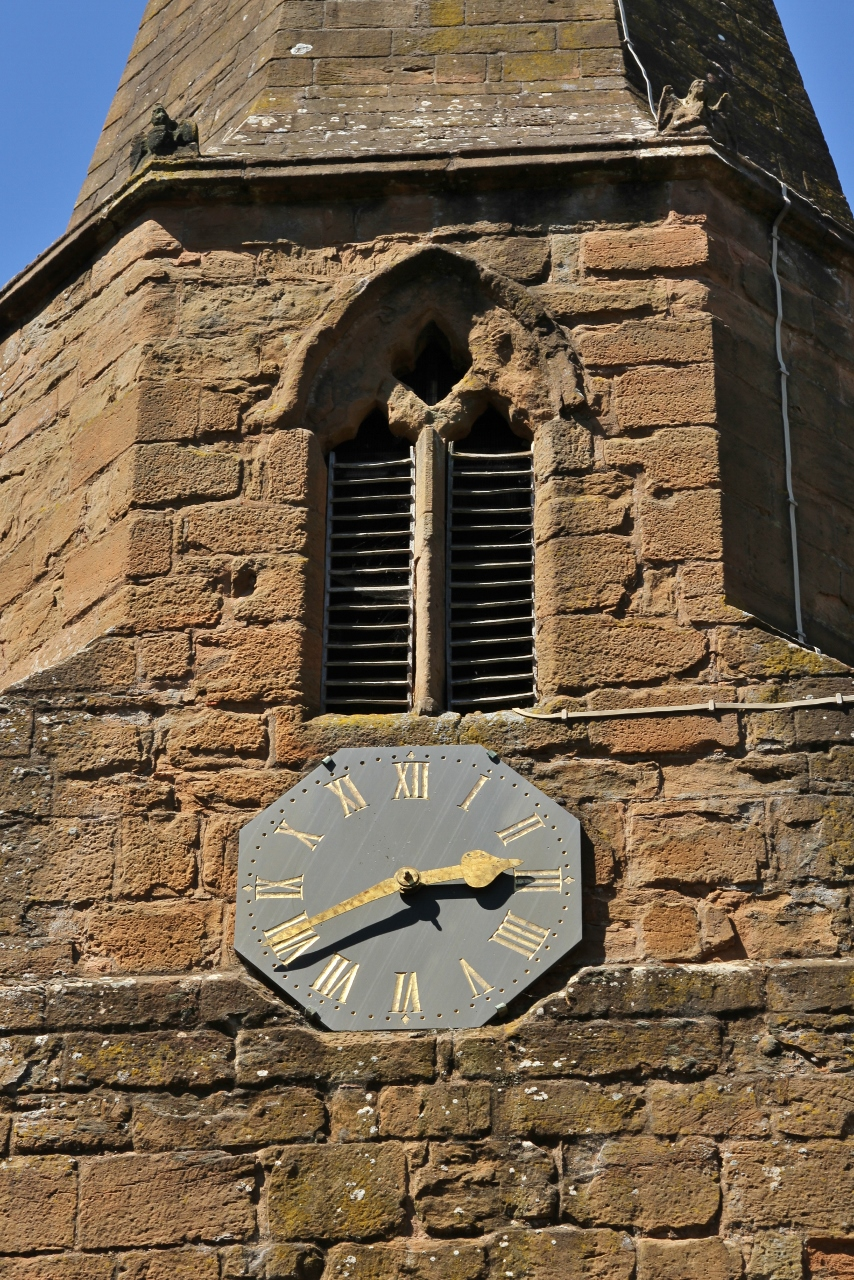
Clock dial and abat-sons on the south side of the west tower

The parish inventory of 1552 records four bells plus a Sanctus bell. They included the Great Bell which had been cast for St Mary's when Thomas Kidderminster was Prior (1403–39). In the Commonwealth era cracks were found in the bells, so in 1656 Bryan II Eldridge of Chertsey, Surrey melted them down and recast them as a ring of five and they were re-hung in a new frame. In 1734 Joseph Smith of Edgbaston recast the second bell and in 1793 John Briant of Hertford recast the treble bell.

In 1875 all but the tenor bell were removed. One was given to the newly built St Matthew's parish church in Surbiton, Surrey. John Taylor & Co of Loughborough melted down the other three and recast them as five, increasing the ring to the current six. Taylor's rehung the bells in an oak frame. In the 1950s this frame was found to have worked loose, so in 1957 Taylor's replaced it with a steel frame set in a concrete ring.

Simmons of Warwick made the present turret clock in the west tower in 1865. It is built to have three dials but only one, on the south side of the tower, was installed. However, in 1876 a dial was added on the ceiling of the ringing room. It has no hour hand, only a minute hand, and is for bell-ringers to time their ringing.

=== Organ ===
In 1806 a small organ was installed in the church at a cost of 70 Guineas. In 1903 it was replaced by the present instrument built by J Charles Lee of Coventry. It has three manuals and 1,500 pipes. By 1947 it was in poor order, but the parish felt unable to afford either to have it rebuilt or a new pipe organ built in its stead.

In 1949 Baron Kenilworth provided enough funds for the parish to buy a new two-manual electronic organ made by John Compton, whose usual customers were cinemas and public ballrooms. The pipe organ was left in situ. By the early 1960s the electronic organ was proving unsatisfactory, so in 1962–63 Compton's restored the pipe organ and took back the electronic organ in part exchange.

== Churchyard ==
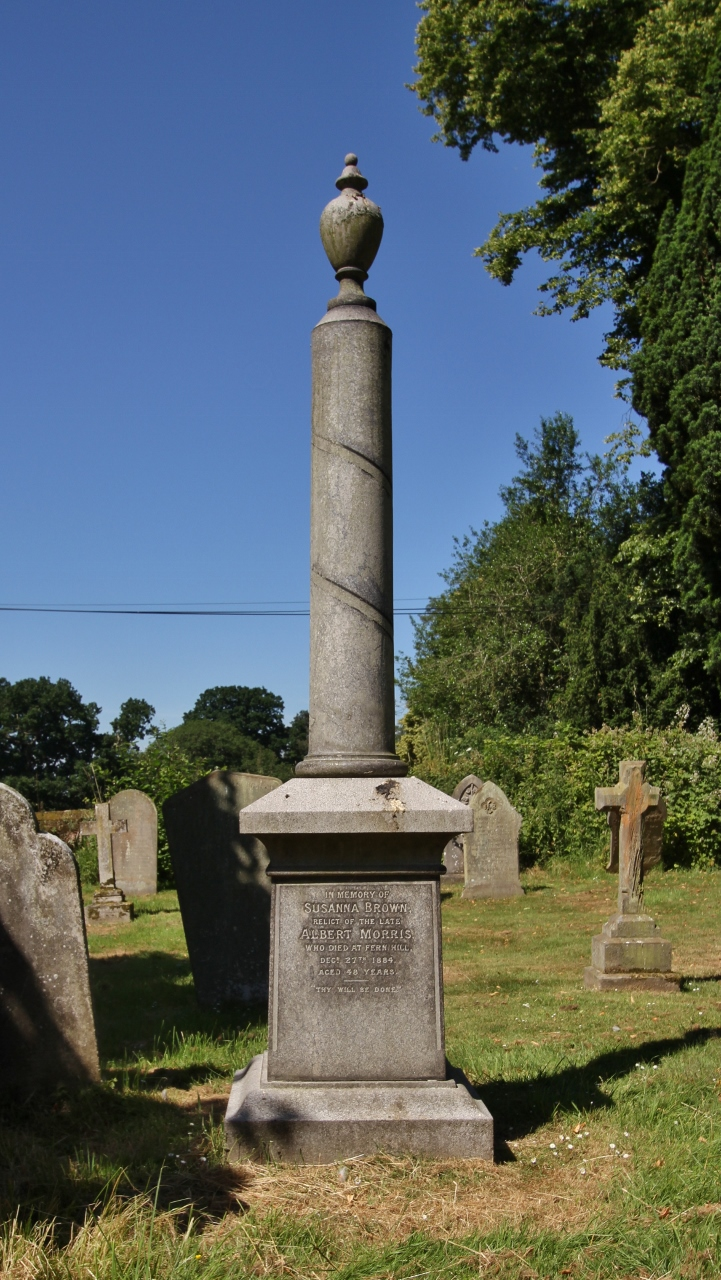
Column marking the grave of Albert Morris, killed in the Shipton-on-Cherwell train crash on Christmas Eve 1874

The churchyard includes numerous 18th- and 19th-century chest tombs and a few bale tombs. A granite column topped by a sculpture of a funerary urn marks the grave of Albert Morris, one of 34 people who were killed in the Shipton-on-Cherwell train crash on Christmas Eve 1874.

Imperial War Graves Commission headstones mark the graves of five servicemen from the First World War: four enlisted soldiers and a Royal Naval Air Service junior officer.

== Royal visits ==
In the Middle Ages both Kenilworth Castle and St Mary's Abbey had royal connections and a succession of royal visitors. However, it is only after the Reformation that English monarchs are known to have visited the parish church.

Queen Elizabeth I visited Kenilworth in 1568 and 1575. The parish has a silver-gilt chalice and cover made in 1568, suggesting that she attended Holy Communion at St Nicholas that year. She is known to have done so during her later stay at the castle on two Sundays in July 1575.

King James I visited Kenilworth in 1616, when the church's great doorway was "unsealed" for his ceremonial entry.

== List of incumbents ==
The names of incumbents from 1285 onward are recorded. There is a gap in the record from 1552 to 1611.

- Stella Bailey (October 2016)
- Richard Awre 1999
- David John Rake 1986
- Frank Spencer Bull 1966
- John Alexander Thomson 1955
- Owen Ambrose Griffiths 1945
- Christopher Milner 1942, father of Major Christopher Milner, MC
- Charles Henry Selfe Matthews 1938
- Edward Stephen Gladstone Wickham 1931
- Joseph William Dennis 1917
- James Cairns 1911
- Roland Forster Hanning 1897
- William Bissett 1891
- Alfred Jonathan Binnie 1884
- Thomas Edmond Pennefather 1875
- William Frederick Bickmore 1855
- Edward Revell Eardley-Wilmot 1845
- Thomas Parry 1841
- Montague Villiers 1837
- Samuel Butler 1802
- Robert Sumner 1773
- Thomas Lucas 1740
- William Best 1690
- James Dingley 1689
- Robert Edmonds 1684
- Eustace Craddock 1679
- Henry Price 1678
- James Chapman 1663
- William Maddock 1661 (ejected 1662)
- Anthony Woodhill 1648
- William Morris 1646
- Edward Barton 1643
- John Bust 1611
- Richard ap Damerllord 1552
- Thomas Bird 1545
- John Pultney 1524
- Thomas Westbyr (alias Barbour) 1504
- John Wright 1500
- Thomas Rawlinson 1498
- Hugh Chesnal 1481
- John Arnold 1478
- William Umfrey 1476
- Richard Harris 1474
- John Meverell 1471
- John Baker 1467
- John Brampton 1465
- John Audley 1457
- Richard Braunston 1454
- William Chapman 1447
- John Smith 1441
- Richard Lyne 1437
- Robert Loughborough 1436
- William Porter 1411
- Richard atte Birches 1373
- William of Covele (Cowley) 1361
- John King 1353
- Roger de Birmingham 1351
- Ralph Rokeby (Rugby) 1349
- John de Calwich 1349
- William de Preston 1349
- Henry de Ansty 1346
- Thomas de Wakefield 1341
- John de Hanslope 1323
- William de Stoneleigh 1316
- Geoffrey Marmion 1312
- Roger Boyvill 1312
- Henry de Ladbroke 1300
- Richard de Kenilworth 1285

== Bibliography ==
- Anonymous (1975). Queen Elizabeth's Visit to Kenilworth, 1575. Kenilworth: Kenilworth History and Archaeology Society.
- Anonymous (2008). The Parish Church of St. Nicholas, Kenilworth: A Guide to the Building and its History. Kenilworth: St Nicholas Church.
- Hilton, Geoffrey (2004). John Strecche, Canon of Kenilworth:: The Life and Times of a Medieval Historian. Warwickshire: GM Hilton. ISBN 978-0953692323.
- Pevsner, Nikolaus; Wedgwood, Alexandra (1966). Warwickshire. The Buildings of England. Harmondsworth: Penguin Books. pp. 317–318.
- Salzman, L. F., ed. (1951). "Kenilworth". A History of the County of Warwick. Victoria County History. Vol. 6: Knightlow hundred. London: Oxford University Press for the Institute of Historical Research. pp. 132–143.
- Sunley, Harry; Stevens, Norman (2015) [1995]. Kenilworth: The Story of the Abbey (2nd ed.). Kenilworth: The Pleasaunce Press. ISBN 978-0902372160.
- Thomson, J. A. (1964). Kenilworth Church and Abbey.
