= The Princely Pleasures, at the Court at Kenilworth =

1576 book by George Gascoigne

The Princely Pleasures, at the Court at Kenilworth (1576) by George Gascoigne, is an account of courtly entertainments held by Robert Dudley, the first Earl of Leicester upon Queen Elizabeth I’s three weeks visit to his Kenilworth Castle, Warwickshire in 1575. Based on European festival book models, Gascoigne's pamphlet is an idealized version of the courtly revels occasioned to entertain the Queen during her stay at the castle from 9 July to 27 July.

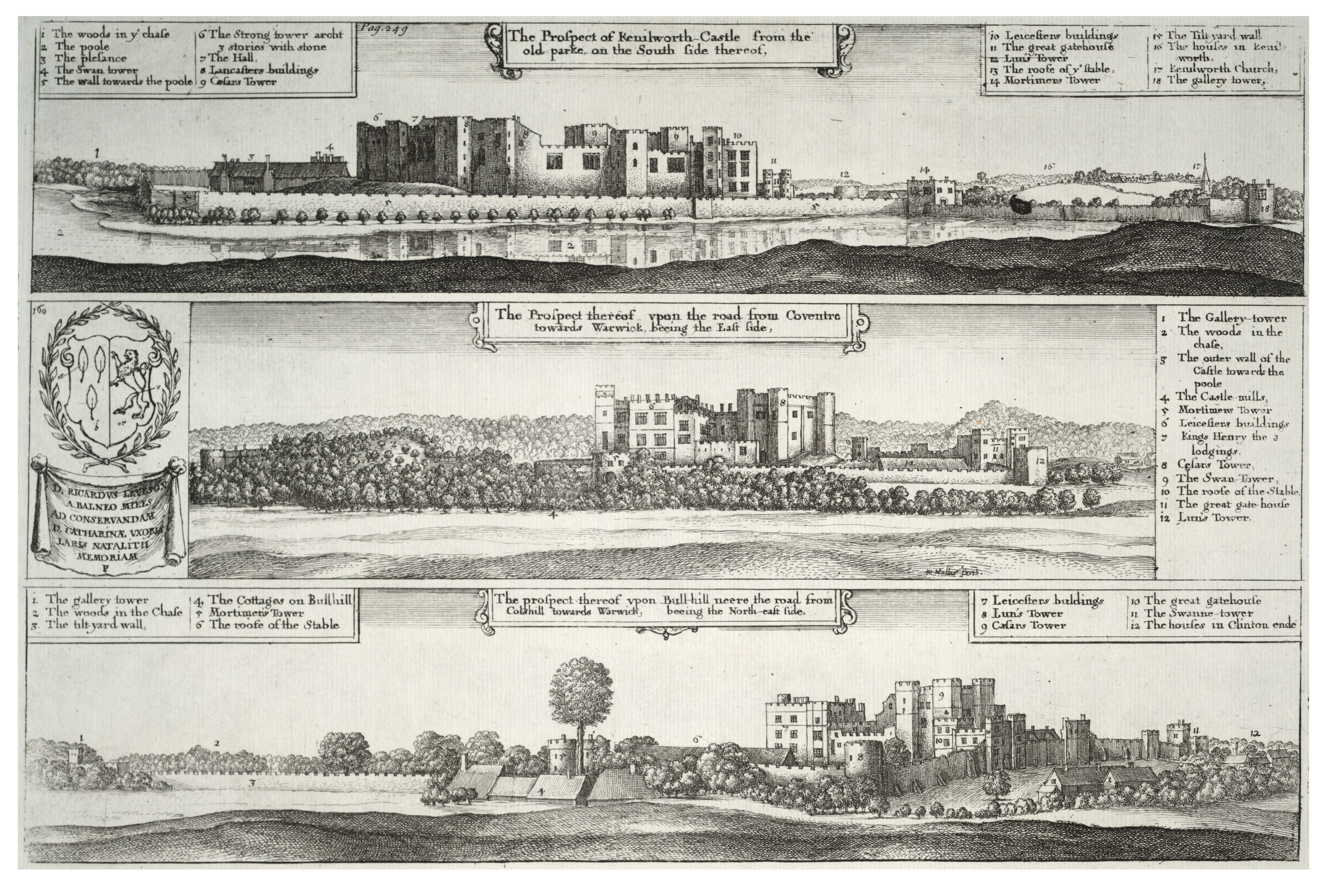
Wenceslas Hollar, Kenilworth Castle before Civil War, 1656

== Publication ==
The first publication of The Princely Pleasures appeared anonymously by the printer and bookseller Richard Jones (1564-1613) with the complete title "The Princelye pleasures, at the Courte at Kenelwoorth. That is to saye. The Copies of all such Verses, Proses, or Poeticall inuentions, and other deuices of pleasure, as were there deuised, and presented by sundry Gentlemen, before the QVENES MAIESTIE: In the yeare 1575."

The second, posthumous, edition of the text was printed in Gascoigne's 1587 Whole Woorkes. The Princely Pleasures is Gascoigne's version of the Kenilworth revels, which one scholar has described as "sixteenth-century England’s grandest and most extravagant party." Gascoigne's text emphasizes the poetry and prose that was composed for the occasion.

A different account of Queen Elizabeth's entertainment at Kenilworth, by Robert Langham, also survives. Printed c. 1580, it is entitled "A LETTER: whearin, part of the entertainment vntoo the Queenz Maiesty, at Killinwoorth Castl, in warwik Sheer, in this soomerz Progress. 1575. iz signified." Langham's account pays more attention to the popular, local entertainments on display during the queen's visit.

== Synopsis ==
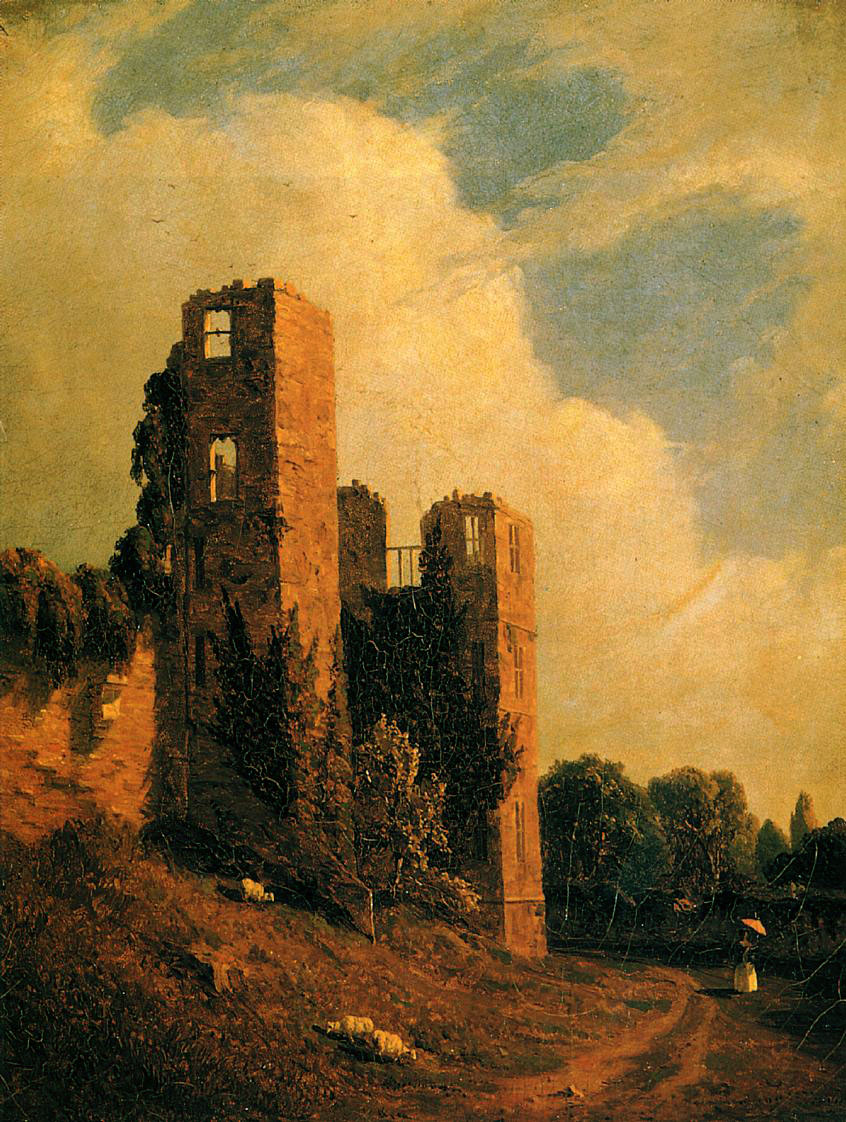
Gifford Sanford Robinson, Kenilworth Castle, 1858

The preface to Gascoigne's The Princely Pleasures describes what follows as "sundry pleasaunt and Poeticall inuentions... as well in verse as in prose." The text includes notes on the dates of the events and their creators, explanations of the nature of the performance, and the poetry and prose. The ten reported stations are:

- Station of Sibilla: Near the castle gate a Sibyl prophecies "a prosperous raigne, that she [the Queen] should continue, according to the happy beginning of the same." This device is credited to William Hunnis, Master of the Children of the Chapel Royal.
- Station of the Knights of King Arthur: A dumbshow of trumpeters in the guise of King Arthur's knights welcome the Queen.
- Station of Hercules: Hercules, here a porter, extols the magnificence of the queen and presents to her the keys to the castle. This section is credited to John Badger.
- Station of the Lady of the Lake: Attended with two nymphs, the Lady comes out of the pool on the base court, "being so conueyed that it seemed shee had gonne vpon the water." She speaks about the antiquity of the castle and the Arthurian ancestry of the residents. This section is credited to George Ferrers.
- Station of the Latin Poet: An actor in guise of a poet speaks Latin verse. This section is credited to Richard Mulcaster, the first headmaster of Merchant Taylor's School.

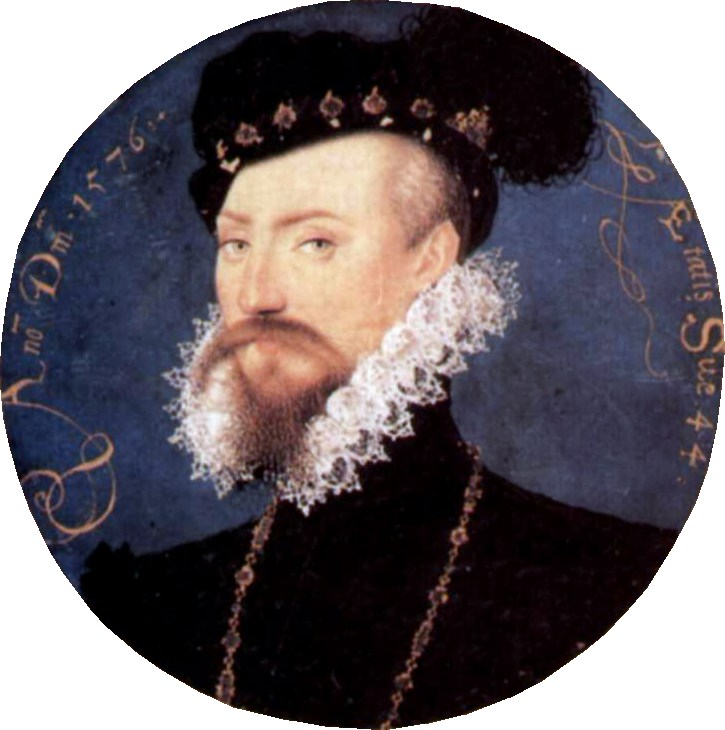
Nicolas Hilliard, Robert Dudley, Earl of Leicester, 1576

- Station of the Savage Man and Eccho: Gascoigne himself, dressed as a "sauage man," meets Elizabeth on her way back from hunting. Together with an actor in the guise of Eccho, he engages in a versified dialogue praising the beauty and grandeur of the Queen. This event is credited to Gascoigne.
- Station of the delivery of the Lady of the Lake: Upon her return from hunting, Tryton comes towards Elizabeth as she passes over the bridge and informs her of the distressful situation of the Lady of the Lake who has to live eternally in the lake unless she is delivered by the presence of a "better meide then hir selfe." Neptune sends Tryton to beseech the queen's help, explaining that her mere presence will set the Lady free.
- Station of the song of Protheus: After the queen frees the Lady of the Lake, a water pageant begins with Protheus appearing on a dolphin float with a musical consort inside: "the Dolphyn was conueied vpon the boate, so that the Owners seen to bee his Fynnes. With in the which Dolphyn a Consort of Musicke was secretly placed, the which sounded, and Protheus clearing his voyce, sang his song of congratulation." This section is credited to William Hunnis.
- Station of Zabeta masque: Gascoigne explains that this masque commissioned "at incredible cost," designed for a pavilion outside the castle, was cancelled apparently due to the bad weather. It is included in Gascoigne's printed text nevertheless, and it tells the story of Zabeta, originally a nymph of Diana. The masque's commentary on virginity and marriage renders it a loaded allusion to Elizabeth I, to whom Robert Dudley may wish to propose.
- Station of Syluanus’ farewell: On Elizabeth’s departure, Gascoigne in the guise of Syluanus, the god of woods, appears from behind a holly bush, walks beside the Queen’s horse, and tells her that all things are saddened by the Queen’s departure.

== Architecture and Performance ==
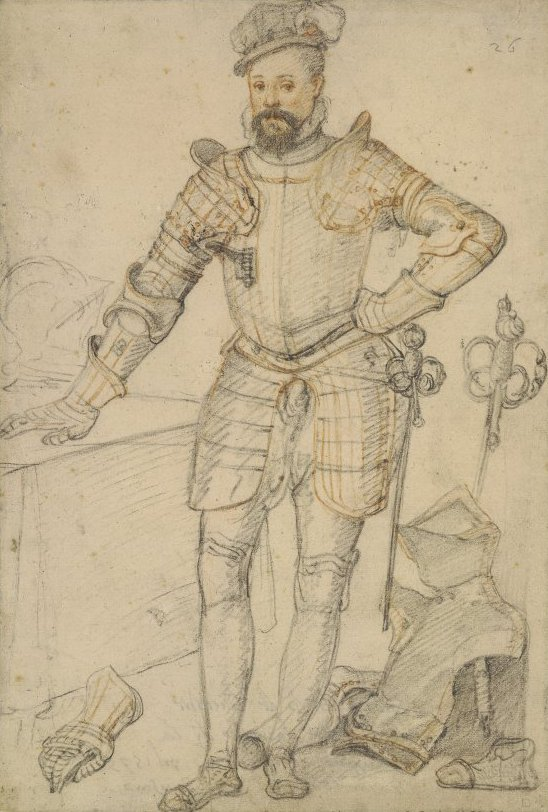
Federico Zuccaro, Robert Dudley, Earl of Leicester, 1575

In preparation for the Queen's visit, Dudley spent the enormous sum of £40,000 to £60,000 on building and landscaping. Alison Weir refers to the castle as "one of the wonders of the age, resorted not in Renaissance style like most Elizabethan houses, but in a medieval style in keeping with its twelfth-century structure." The revels were intended for three purposes according to Goldring: first, to rebuild Dudley's family history and change it from "the son of the disgraced Duke of Northumberland, executed for treason in 1553, [to]... a princely descendant of King Arthur"; second, to advocate English military intervention in the Dutch revolt against Spain; and finally to propose marriage to the Queen. For the last purpose Dudley also commissioned Federico Zuccaro, the Italian Mannerist painter, to a paint himself and Elizabeth. Though the preliminary drawings exist, the original paintings, believed to be the leitmotif of the 1575 Kenilworth festivities, are not known to survive. The paintings were intended to be life-sized and full length, a format befitting "Leicester’s princely ambitions and with the ongoing effort to use visual imagery to present himself as a would-be consort for the Queen." The festivities included many spectacular events described in Langham's Letter, from fireworks devised by an Italian expert in pyrotechnics, to musicians and gardeners who make a garden overnight under the Queen's chamber window, to a country wedding feast.

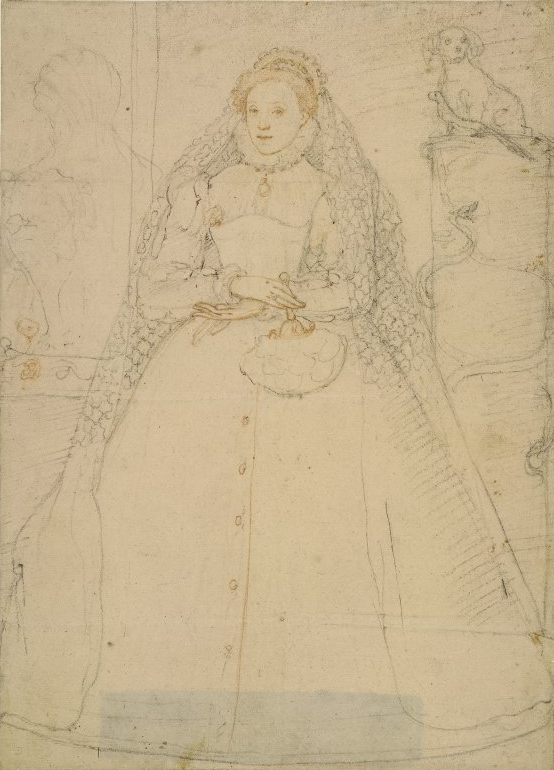
Federico Zucarro, Queen Elizabeth I, 1575

== Reception and influence ==
The devices for the queen's entertainment at Kenilworth inspired many texts, including Ben Jonson's The Masque of the Owls (1624) and The King’s Entertainment at Welbeck in Nottinghamshire (1633). Walter Scott’s Kenilworth (1821) is a highly influential account of the Kenilworth revels. Arthur Sullivan's Kenilworth, A Masque of the Days of Queen Elizabeth (1864), commonly known as "The Masque at Kenilworth," is a nineteenth century cantata based on the 1575 event.
