= Captain Cox =

English collector of ballads and romances (fl. 1575)

Captain Cox of Coventry (fl. 1575) was an English collector of ballads and romances. He was present at Kenilworth on Queen Elizabeth's visit in 1575 and took a leading part in one of the royal entertainments.

== Works ==
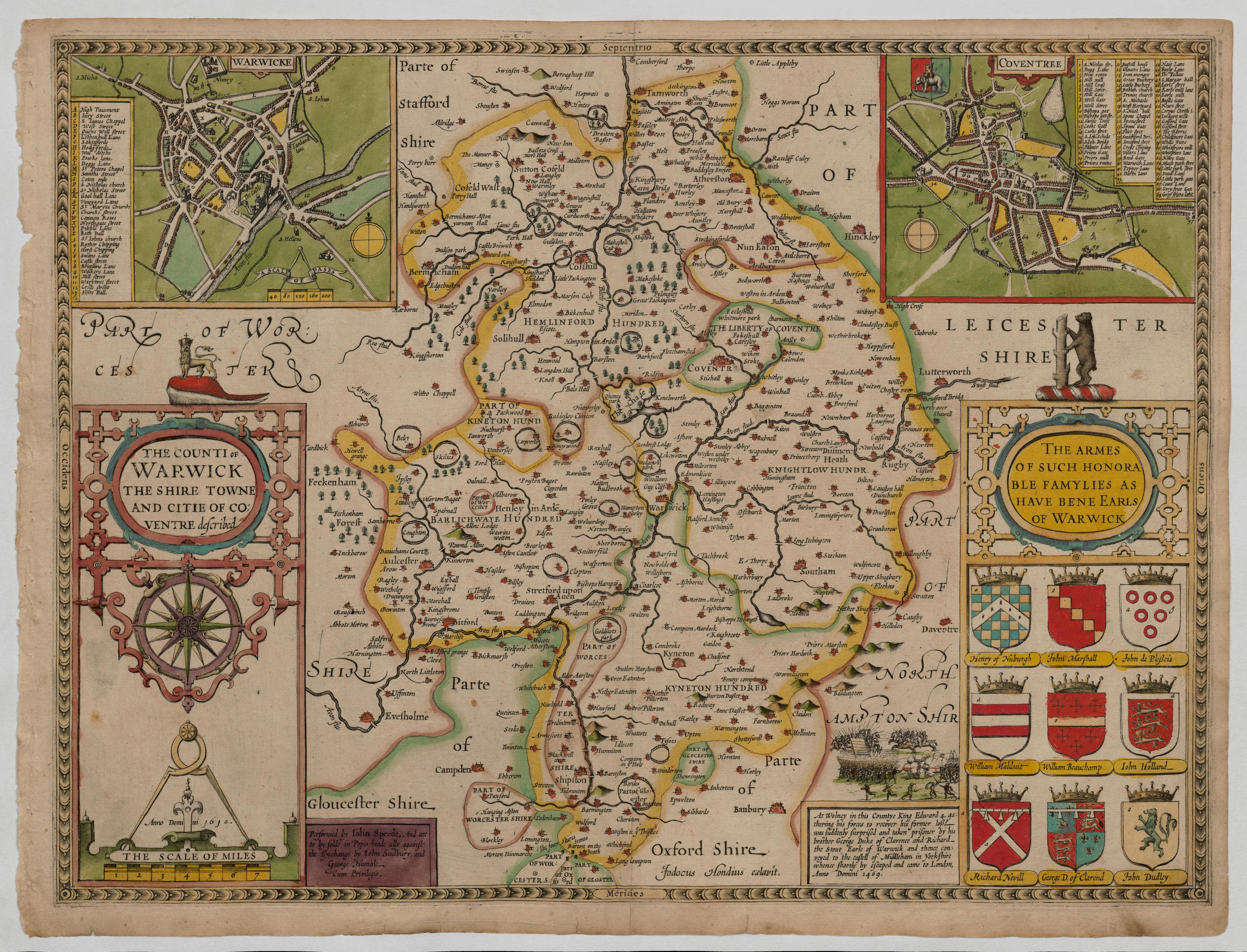
Map of the county of Warwickshire by John Speed, c. 1611

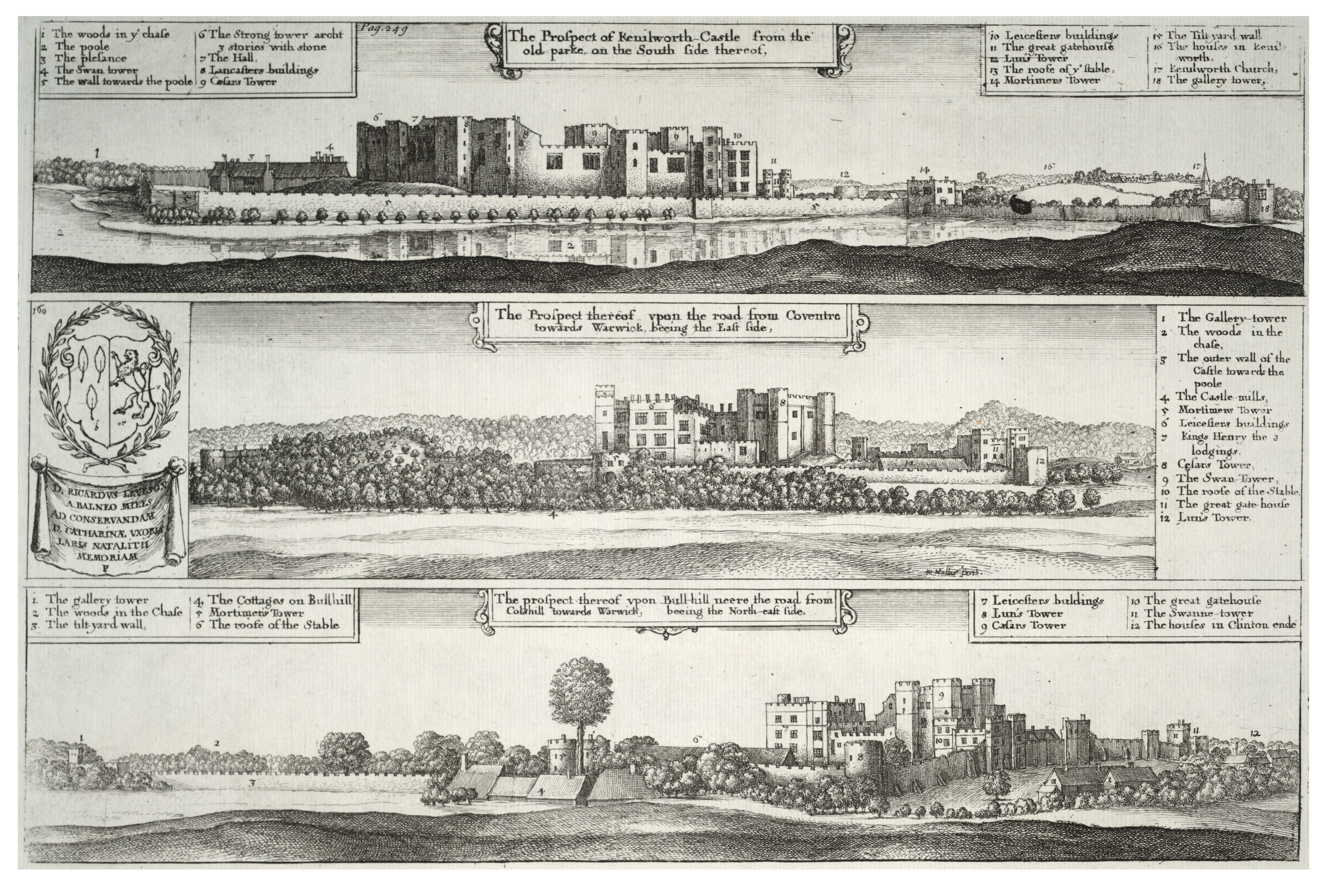
Three views of Kenilworth Castle by Wenceslas Hollar, 17th century

Captain Cox, collector of ballads and romances, is described as "an od man, I promiz yoo: by profession a mason, and that right skilfull; very cunning in fens, and hardy as Gavin; … great oversight hath he in matters of storie". The contents of the captain's library, which are described by Laneham at considerable length, are of the most curious character. Among the entertainments provided for Queen Elizabeth during her visit to Kenilworth was a burlesque imitation of a battle, from an old romance, and Captain Cox took a leading part. He is introduced on his hobby-horse in Ben Jonson's Mask of Owls, at Kenelworth. Presented by the Ghost of Captain Cox, 1626.

== Sources ==
- Bullen, A. H.; Goldring, Elizabeth (2004). "Cox, Captain, of Coventry (fl. 1575), collector of ballads and romances". Oxford Dictionary of National Biography (online ed.). Oxford University Press. doi:10.1093/ref:odnb/6517. (Subscription, Wikipedia Library access or UK public library membership required.)
- Laneham, Robert (1784). A Letter whearin, part of the entertainment unto the Queenz Majesty at Killingwoorth Castl, in Warwik Sh'eer, in this Soomerz Progress, 1575, iz signified. 8vo. Warwick: Printed by and for J. Sharp. p. 36.

Attribution:

- This article incorporates text from a publication now in the public domain: Bullen, Arthur Henry (1887). "Cox, Captain". In Stephen, Leslie (ed.). Dictionary of National Biography. Vol. 12. London: Smith, Elder & Co. p. 403.
