= George Gascoigne =

16th-century English poet and courtier

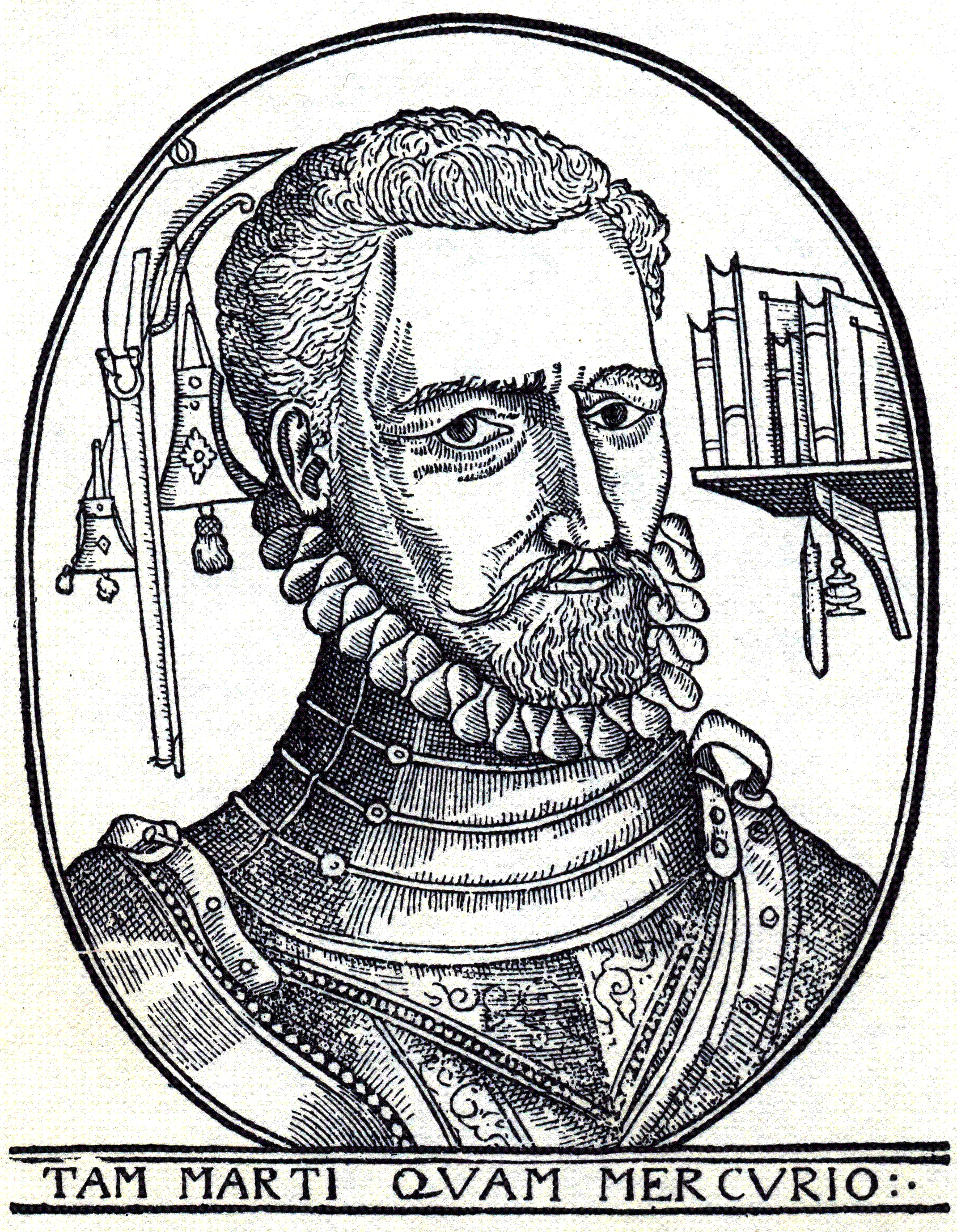
George Gascoigne portrait from the frontispiece of The Steele Glas and Complaynte of Phylomene (1576)

George Gascoigne (/ˈɡæskɔɪn/ GASK-oyn; c. 1535 – 7 October 1577) was an English poet, soldier and unsuccessful courtier. He is considered the most important poet of the early Elizabethan era, following Sir Thomas Wyatt and Henry Howard, Earl of Surrey, and leading to the emergence of Philip Sidney. He was the first poet to deify Queen Elizabeth I, in effect establishing her cult as a virgin goddess married to her kingdom and subjects. His most noted works include A Discourse of the Adventures of Master FJ (1573), an account of courtly intrigue and one of the earliest English prose fictions; The Supposes (performed in 1566, printed in 1573), an early translation of Ariosto and the first comedy written in English prose, which was used by Shakespeare as a source for The Taming of the Shrew; and the frequently anthologised short poem "Gascoignes woodmanship" (1573) and "Certayne Notes of Instruction concerning the making of verse or ryme in English" (1575), the first essay on English versification.

== Early life ==
The eldest son of Sir John Gascoigne of Cardington, Bedfordshire, Gascoigne was educated at Trinity College, Cambridge, and on leaving the university is supposed to have joined the Middle Temple. He became a member of Gray's Inn in 1555. He has been identified without much show of evidence with a lawyer named Gastone who was in prison in 1548 under very discreditable circumstances. There is no doubt that his escapades were notorious, and that he was imprisoned for debt. George Whetstone says that Sir John Gascoigne disinherited his son on account of his follies, but by his own account he was obliged to sell his patrimony to pay the debts contracted at court. He was MP for Bedford in 1557–1558 and 1558–1559, but when he presented himself in 1572 for election at Midhurst he was refused on the charges of being "a defamed person and noted for manslaughter", "a common Rymer and a deviser of slaunderous Pasquelles", "a notorious rufilanne", and a constantly indebted atheist.

His poems, with the exception of some commendatory verses, were not published before 1572, but they may have circulated in manuscript before that date. He tells us that his friends at Gray's Inn importuned him to write on Latin themes set by them, and that two of his plays were acted there. He repaired his fortunes by marrying the wealthy widow of William Breton, thus becoming stepfather to the poet Nicholas Breton. In 1568 an inquiry into the disposition of William Breton's property with a view to the protection of the children's rights was instituted before the Lord Mayor, but the matter was probably settled in a friendly manner, for Gascoigne continued to hold the Breton Walthamstow estate, which he had from his wife, until his death.

== Plays at Gray's Inn ==
Gascoigne translated two plays performed in 1566 at Gray's Inn, the most aristocratic of the Renaissance London Inns of Court: the prose comedy Supposes based on Ariosto's I Suppositi, and Jocasta, a tragedy in blank verse which is said to have derived from Euripides's Phoenissae, but appears more directly as a translation from the Italian of Lodovico Dolce's Giocasta.

== A Hundreth Sundry Flowres (1573) and Posies of Gascoigne (1575) ==
Gascoigne's best known and controversial work was originally published in 1573 under the title A Hundreth Sundry Flowres bound up in one small Poesie. Gathered partely (by translation) in the fyne outlandish Gardins of Euripides, Ovid, Petrarch, Ariosto and others; and partly by Invention out of our owne fruitefull Orchardes in Englande, Yelding Sundrie Savours of tragical, comical and moral discourse, bothe pleasaunt and profitable, to the well-smelling noses of learned readers, by London printer Richarde Smith. The book purports to be an anthology of courtly poets, gathered and edited by Gascoigne and two other editors known only by the initials "H.W." and "G.T." The book's content is throughout suggestive of courtly scandal, and the aura of scandal is skilfully elaborated through the effective use of initials and posies—Latin or English tags supposed to denote particular authors—in place of the real names of actual or alleged authors.

Judged to be offensive, the book was "seized by Her Majesty's High Commissioners." Gascoigne republished the book with certain additions and deletions two years later under the alternative title, The Posies of George Gascoigne, Esquire. The new edition contains three new dedicatory epistles, signed by Gascoigne, which apologise for the offence that the original edition had caused. This effort failed, however, as the book was also ruled offensive and likewise seized.

== At war in the Netherlands ==
When Gascoigne sailed as a soldier of fortune to the Low Countries in 1572, his ship was driven by stress of weather to Brielle, which luckily for him had just fallen into the hands of the Dutch. He obtained a captain's commission, and took an active part in the campaigns of the next two years including the Middelburg siege, during which he acquired a profound dislike of the Dutch, and a great admiration for William of Orange, who had personally intervened on his behalf in a quarrel with his colonel, and secured him against the suspicion caused by his clandestine visits to a lady at the Hague.

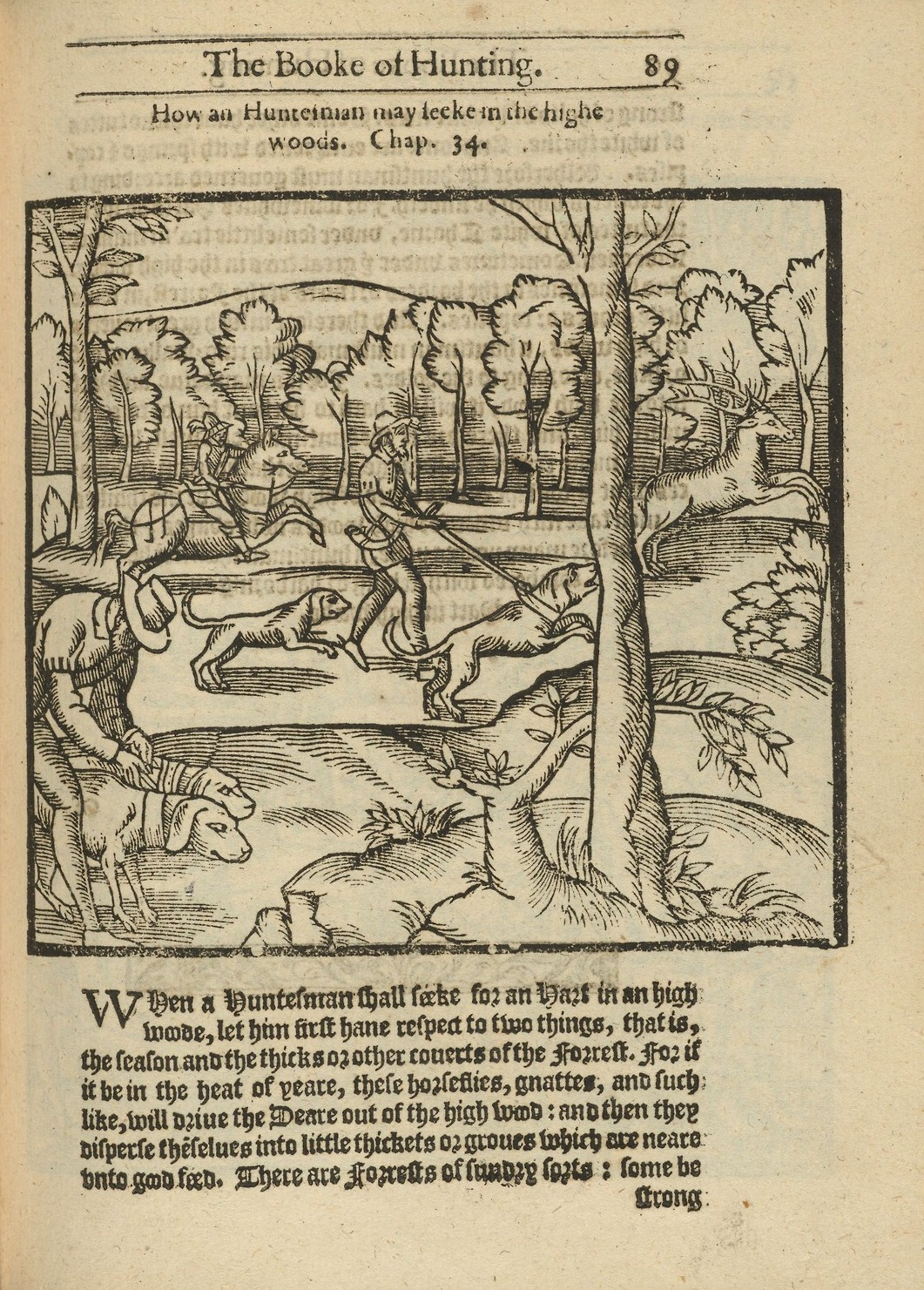
1611 edition of The Noble Art of Venerie or Hunting, translated by Gascoigne and printed by Thomas Purfoot

Taken prisoner after the evacuation of Valkenburg by English troops during the Siege of Leiden, he was sent to England in the autumn of 1574. He dedicated to Lord Grey de Wilton the story of his adventures, The Fruites of Warres (printed in the edition of 1575) and Gascoigne's Voyage into Hollande. In 1575 he had a share in devising the masques, published in the next year as The Princely Pleasures at the Courte at Kenelworth, written to celebrate the queen's 1575 visit to the Earl of Leicester at Kenilworth Castle. At Woodstock in 1575 he delivered a prose speech before Elizabeth, and was present at a reading of the Pleasant Tale of Hemetes the Hermit, a brief romance, probably written by the queen's host, Sir Henry Lee. At the queen's annual gift exchange with members of her court the following New Year's, Gascoigne gave her a manuscript of Hemetes which he had translated into Latin, Italian, and French. Its frontispiece shows the Queen rewarding the kneeling poet with an accolade and a purse; its motto, "Tam Marti, quam Mercurio", indicates that he will serve her as a soldier, as a scholar-poet, or as both. He also drew three emblems, with accompanying text in the three other languages. He also translated Jacques du Fouilloux's La Venerie (1561) into English as The Noble Arte of Venerie or Hunting (1575) which was printed together with George Turberville's The Book of Falconrie or Hawking and is thus sometimes misattributed to Turberville though in fact it was a work by Gascoigne.

== Later writings and influences ==
Most of his works were published during the last years of his life after his return from the wars. He died in Stamford in Lincolnshire on 7 October 1577 and was buried on 13 October in the graveyard of St Mary's Church, Stamford.

Gascoigne's theory of metrical composition is explained in a short critical treatise, "Certayne notes of instruction concerning the making of verse or ryme in English, written at the request of Master Edouardo Donati", prefixed to his Posies (1575). He acknowledged Chaucer as his master, and differed from the earlier poets of the school of Henry Howard, Earl of Surrey, and Thomas Wyatt chiefly in the greater smoothness and sweetness of his verse. In this text, Gascoigne emphasises the importance of 'invention' in writing a poem: "the rule of invention, which of all other rules is most to be marked".

== See also ==
- Canons of Elizabethan poetry
- Good Morrowe, poem by Gascoigne set to music by Sir Edward Elgar, 1929
- Gillian Austen, "George Gascoigne", Studies in Renaissance Literature, 24, D.S. Brewer, 2008
- G. W. Pigman, George Gascoigne, A Hundredth Sundrie Flowres 1573, Oxford, 2000
- Ronald Binns, Gascoigne: The Life of a Tudor Poet, York: Zoilus Press, 2021 ISBN 9781999735944
