= Robert of Ropsley =

Robert of Ropsley was an important household knight who had a close relationship with John, King of England

== Origins ==
He was the leader of a minor knightly family in Lincolnshire owing fealty to William d'Albini of Bevoir.

== Life and career ==
He was constable of Bristol castle from August 1204 to March 1208. From July 1207 to sometime in 1210 he held the castle of Kenilworth Castle, an extremely important castle as it controlled the trade routes to Coventry and was an important administrative center in Warwickshire. In 1207 he was appointed itinerant justice in Warwickshire. It is known that he held the Honour (Barony) of Leicester as custodian in 1205-1209 along with the archdeacon of Staffordshire. He was sheriff of Warwickshire and Leicestershire between 1212 and 1215. It is likely that Robert had considerable control in Leicestershire given the fact that he was custodian between 1205 and 1209 and thus had the chance to establish himself as a powerful player within the shire.

In 1215 he was among the representatives sent to Otto of Brunswick along with Robert of Burgate. During King John's reign Robert is recorded as having witnessed 20 charters, an indication that he was at the kings side in intervals and he was an important member of John's court. Shortly after June 14, 1215 he had defected to the barons side in the First Barons War despite his close relationship with king John. This was because he held some of his lands from or near rebels: William d'Albini of Belvoir and some lands in the Honour of Richmond. Despite four letters offering safe conduct to Robert if he would rejoin the royal cause, he was a rebel through and through after 1215.

== Fiefs ==
From William d'Albini of Belvoir:

Manor of Ropsley - Lincolnshire

From The Barons of Richmond:

Manor of Frampton - Lincolnshire Manor of Donington - Lincolnshire

== Family ==
He married Mabel de Limsey daughter of Gerard de Limsey and widow of Hugh Bardulf. The marriage was almost certainly arranged by the king as a reward for his services.

== Bibliography ==
- Church, S. D. (1999). The Household Knights of King John. Cambridge University Press. ISBN 0-511-00213-0. OCLC 48139481.
