= Geoffrey de Clinton =

12th-century Anglo-Norman nobleman and royal official

Geoffrey de Clinton (died c. 1134) was an Anglo-Norman noble, chamberlain and treasurer to King Henry I of England. He was foremost amongst the men king Henry "raised from the dust". He married Lescelina.

== Life ==
Clinton's family origins are a little obscure. The surname probably derives from the village of Glympton in Oxfordshire., though the family ultimately hailed from Saint-Pierre-de-Semilly (Manche, arr. St. Lô, canton St.-Clair) in western Normandy.

It appears that Clinton spent some years as a minor official of the king, until the 1118 fall of the treasurer Herbert camerarius, who was accused of plotting against the king. By 1120 Clinton had taken his place.

Not too long afterwards Clinton was appointed Sheriff of Warwickshire (c. 1121), to act as counterweight to the Earl of Warwick, Roger de Beaumont, whom Henry I did not trust. The 1122 rebellion of Roger's cousin Waleran de Beaumont, 1st Earl of Worcester increased the king's suspicions still further, and he compelled Roger to grant Clinton substantial parts of his Warwickshire domain.

Clinton further secured his position by starting work on the great castle of Kenilworth, only five miles from the Beaumonts' central fortress at Warwick.

Clinton received other grants of land from Henry I, and he used his position of political influence to enrich himself in other ways; his sum total of wealth rose to become just below the level of the greatest magnates of the kingdom. He had enough to spend 2,000 pounds to insure his nephew Roger de Clinton's election as Bishop of Coventry.

Around Easter 1130 Clinton was accused of treason, but was acquitted by a tribunal including King David I of Scotland, who was sitting in his capacity as Earl of Huntingdon. The substance of the accusations against Clinton are not known, although since he was Henry I's treasurer, financial malfeasance of some sort seems possible. The Beaumonts were back in favor, and it may be that they were behind the proceedings.

Clinton remained in the royal service, though he was never as influential as he had been. He died sometime between 1133 and 1135.

It appears that Clinton's land-holding must have been primarily life tenancies since his descendants' property was not nearly so great. His son and successor, also named Geoffrey, became engaged in a violent quarrel with the Earl of Warwick early in the reign of King Stephen. The Clintons nearly lost everything, but in the end a settlement was reached (probably in the summer of 1138) by which the younger Geoffrey de Clinton married Warwick's daughter Agnes.
