= Good Morrow =

1557 poem by George Gascoigne set to music by Edward Elgar in 1929

"Good Morrowe" is a poem written by George Gascoigne in 1557 and set to music by the English composer Sir Edward Elgar in 1929. Elgar titled it in modern English "Good Morrow" with the subtitle "A simple Carol for His Majesty's happy recovery", and it is a setting for unaccompanied four-part choir (SATB), though a piano accompaniment is provided.

The work was written to celebrate the recovery of King George V from serious illness. In October 1929, Elgar, as Master of the King's Musick, was invited by Walford Davies (organist at St. George's Chapel, Windsor and himself next holder of that post) to write an appropriate work to be performed by the choir of St. George's at their Annual Concert in Windsor Castle on 9 December 1929. Elgar conducted the choir, and the performance was broadcast to the nation.

Elgar found the poem, called "You that have spent the silent night" in a volume of poems by George Gascoigne entitled "A hundreth Sundrie Floures bound up in one small Posie". from which he extracted five verses. He gave the poem a hymn-like setting, possibly from a tune to a hymn "Praise ye the Lord on every height" he had written in his youth, and he called it 'just a simple tune'.

== Lyrics ==
Though Elgar changed Gascoigne's verse to modern English, he requested that the original sixteenth-century text be shown on the last page of the vocal score and be printed like that on programmes:

| Good Morrow (Elgar) You that have spent the silent night In sleep and quiet rest, And joy to see the cheerful light That riseth in the east; Now clear your voice, and cheer your heart, Come help me now to sing: Each willing wight, come bear a part, To praise the heav'nly King. And you whom care in prison keeps, Or sickness doth suppress, Or secret sorrow breaks your sleeps, Or dolours do distress; Yet bear a part in doleful wise, Yea, think it good accord And an acceptable sacrifice, Each sprite to praise the Lord. The little birds which sing so sweet Are like the angels' voice, Which render God His praises meet And teach us to rejoice: And as they more esteem that mirth Than dread the night's annoy, So much we deem our days on earth But hell to heav'nly joy. Unto which joys for to attain, God grant us all His grace, And send us, after worldly pain, In heav'n to have a place, Where we may still enjoy that light Which never shall decay: Lord for Thy mercy lend us might To see that joyful day. The rainbow bending in the sky, Bedeck'd with sundry hues, Is like the seat of God on high, And seems to tell these news: That as thereby He promised To drown the world no more, So by the blood which Christ hath shed, He will our health restore. | Good Morrowe (Gascoigne) You that have spent the silent night In sleepe and quiet rest, And joye to see the cheerfull lyght That ryseth in the East: Now cleare your voyce, and chere your hart, Come helpe me nowe to sing: Eche willing wight, come beare a part, To prayse the heavenly King. And you whome care in prison keepes, Or sickenes dothe suppresse, Or secret sorrow breakes your sleepes, Or dolours doe distresse: Yet beare a parte in dolfull wise, Yea, thinke it good accorde And an acceptable sacrifice, Eche sprite to prayse the lorde. The little byrdes which sing so swete, Are like the angelles voyce, Which render God his prayses meete, And teach us to rejoyce: And as they more esteeme that myrth Than dread the nights anoy, So much we deeme our days on earth, But hell to heavenly joye. Unto which Joyes for to attayne, God graunt us all his grace, And sende us after worldly payne, In heaven to have a place, Where we maye still enjoye that light Which never shall decaye: Lorde for thy mercy lend us might To see that joyfull daye. The Rainbowe bending in the skye, Bedeckte with sundrye hewes, Is like the seate of God on hye, And seemes to tell these newes: That as thereby he promisèd, To drowne the world no more, So by the bloud which Christ hath shead, He will our helth restore. |

== Recordings ==
- Choral Music of Edward Elgar The Choir of Trinity College, Cambridge, director Richard Marlow
