= The Masque of Owls at Kenilworth =

The Masque of Owls at Kenilworth was written by Ben Jonson and performed at Kenilworth Castle on 19 August 1624 for Prince Charles.

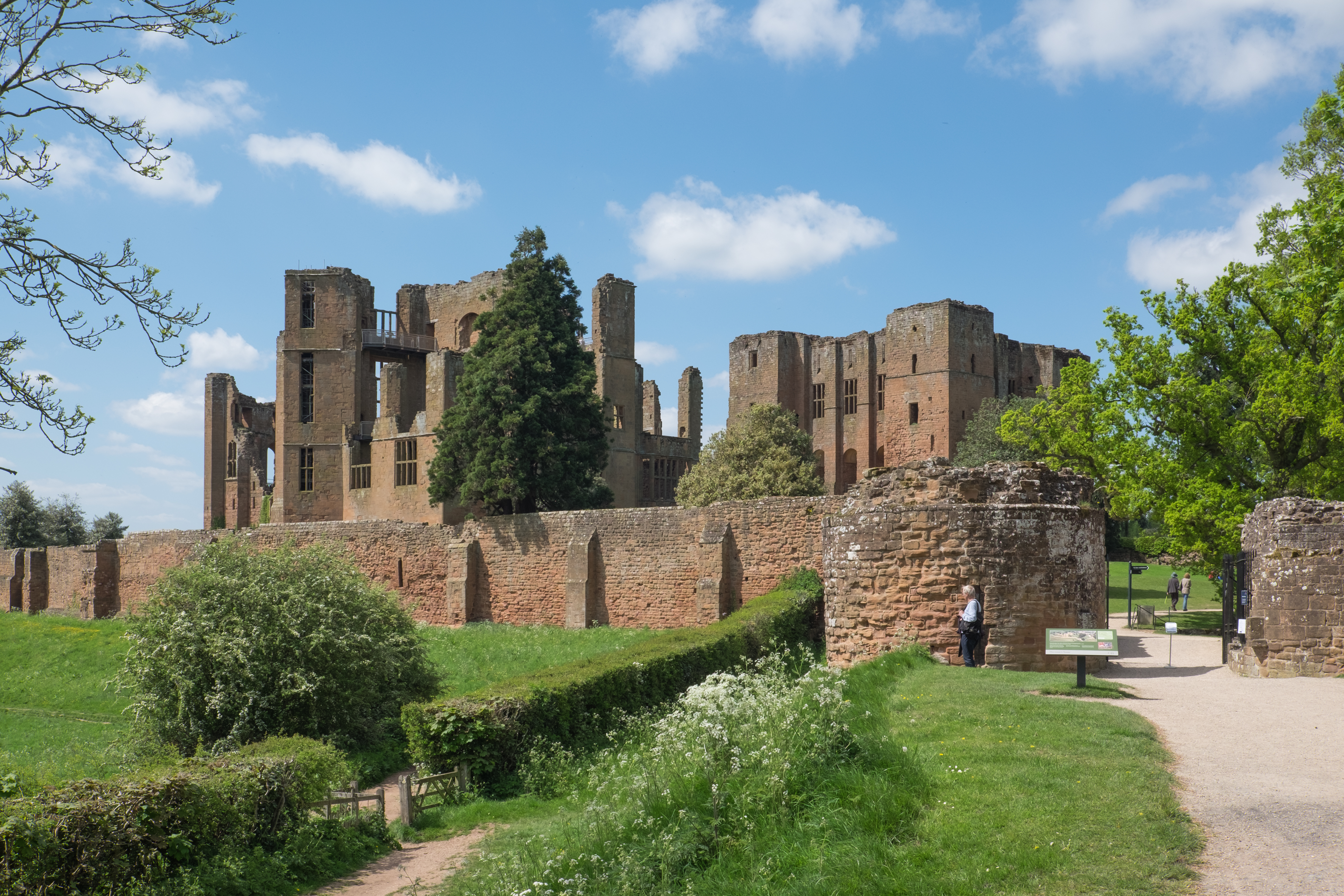
Kenilworth Castle

On 19 August 1624, King James was at Whichnor for dinner with Henry Griffiths of Burton Agnes, and then went to Tamworth, while Prince Charles was at Kenilworth with Sir Robert Carey. The Prince's dinner involved artichokes, ducks, and a barrell of sturgeon, after which he was entertained by an interlude, The Masque of Owls.

== Masque of Owls ==
The masque opens with the ghost of Captain Cox riding a hobby horse. His speech alludes to previous entertainments at Kenilworth for Elizabeth I, including The Princely Pleasures. He had found a nest of six owls, formerly men. The first owl was a London tobacconist, the second a cheesemonger. The third owl was dressed in Coventry blue, and had lost his living as spinner of embroidery thread, and so on. The fifth owl, a language teacher, had pinned his hopes on the Spanish Match.

== John Wolfgang Rumler at the Red Lion ==
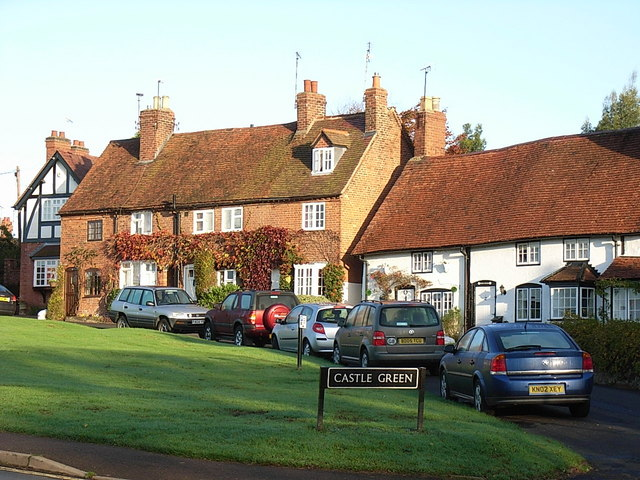
The Castle Green at Kenilworth

The court apothecary John Wolfgang Rumler was with the Prince's party at Kenilworth. He was involved in court theatre, and in 1621 had devised special theatrical makeup for Ben Jonson's masque, The Gypsies Metamorphosed to darken the actors' faces. On 20 August 1624 Rumler and Dr James Chalmers, a Scottish court physician, went to an inn called the Red Lion on the green at Kenilworth. They were angry to find no food and drink and left disappointed, saying they might as well burn the inn's sign. A bystander called Gilbert Tonckes joined in their abuse of the landlord, but went on to criticise hospitality in Scotland, where it was thought few inns offered hospitality on the English model. Chambers and Rumler, as servants of the Scottish-born King James took exception to this. The argument was renewed in the evening. Tonckes' speech against the Scots was considered seditious and he was examined by a magistrate. He begged for the king's mercy for himself and his wife.

At this time a few printed works and manuscripts circulated in England, describing inns and hospitality in Scotland, some written with satirical intent.
