= Langham letter =

The Langham letter, published by 1580, is a significant source for the entertainments of the Elizabethan period in England. Dated from Worcester on 20 August 1575, and titled A letter: whearin, part of the entertainment vntoo the Queenz Maiesty, at Killingwoorth Castl, in Warwik Sheer in this soomerz progress 1575. iz signified: from a freend officer attendant in the coourt, vntoo hiz freend a citizen, and merchaunt of London, it describes the summer 1575 entertainment of Elizabeth I of England by Robert Dudley, 1st Earl of Leicester, at Kenilworth Castle. It is addressed to Humfrey Martyn, the son of Sir Roger Martyn, a master of the Mercers' Company.

== Authorship ==
The authorship of the letter was ascribed to Robert Langham or Laneham (c. 1535–1579/80), a mercer and keeper of the privy council chamber, based on the author's references to himself in the letter as "Lanham" or "Laneham", "Langham", "Ro. La.", and "R. L. Gent. Mercer", and other biographical details, such as his self-description as a "Merchauntaventurer, and Clark of the Councell chamber doore", for which office he writes that he obtained through the patronage of Leicester. Council records confirm that he was paid £10 each April from 1573 to 1579 as keeper of the council chamber.

The letter's editor, R. J. P. Kuin, argues that it is an authentic account by Langham, but others think it was written by William Patten as a joke at Langham's expense, a view which has been accepted by some authorities. The argument for Patten's authorship is based on similarities of form, style, subject matter, and phraseology common to the letter and Patten's acknowledged work and the close resemblance between his known hand and that which appears in two annotated copies of the letter. In addition, Patten himself witnessed the Kenilworth festivities and contributed some Latin verses to welcome the queen.

== Reprints ==
The work was reissued at Warwick in 1784, and was reprinted in John Nichols's Progresses of Queen Elizabeth. Sir Walter Scott quoted from it in his novel Kenilworth (1821), leading to the republication of the Letter in London the same year. Subsequent reprints were in George Adlard's Amye Robsart (1870), in the Rev. Edward Hadarezer Knowles's Castle of Kenilworth (1871), and in the publications of the Ballad Society (ed. Furnivall), 1871.

== See also ==
- Captain Cox
