= John Strecche =

John Strecche was a canon of the Augustinian Priory of St Mary, Kenilworth, Warwickshire. There were three dependent cells of the Priory, one of which was at Brooke in Rutland. Strecche served as Prior there from 1407 to 1425.

== Biography ==
This is the only recorded detail of his life, but much more can be gleaned from a study of his writings. These are kept as Additional Manuscripts 35295 and 38665 in the British Library in London.

Strecche's major work was a History of England, largely compiled from the Polychronicon of Ranulph Higden, but interspersed with accounts of the Priors of Kenilworth. His other work is a collection of educational articles and he was likely responsible for teaching novices.
