= Pop (surname) =

Pop is a Romanian surname.

== List of people with the surname ==
- Adrian Pop (born 1968), Romanian fencer
- Adriana Pop (born 1965), Romanian gymnastics choreographer and rhythmic gymnast
- Alexandru Pop (disambiguation), multiple people
  - Alexandru Pop (footballer, born 2000), Romanian footballer
  - Alexandru Pop (rugby union) (born 1945), Romanian rugby union player
- Anca Pop (1984–2018), Romanian singer-songwriter
- Andrei Pop, Romanian art historian and academic
- Claudia Pop (born 1968), Romanian operatic soprano and music director
- Claudiu-Lucian Pop (born 1972), Romanian Greek-Catholic bishop
- Dănuț Pop (born 1968), Romanian judoka
- Darius Pop (born 1994), Romanian politician
- Edina Pop (born 1941), Hungarian musician
- Eric Pop (born 1975), Romanian engineer and academic
- Erik Pop (born 2006), Canadian soccer player
- Florian Pop (born 1952), Romanian mathematician
- Gabriel Pop (born 1998), Romanian rugby union player
- Gheorghe Pop (born 1993), Romanian biathlete
- Gheorghe Pop de Băsești (1835–1919), Austro-Hungarian and Romanian politician
- Gordana Pop-Lazić (born 1956), Serbian politician
- Ioan Pop (born 1954), Romanian fencer
- Ioan-Aurel Pop (born 1955), Romanian historian
- Irina Pop (born 1988), Dominican handball player
- Iulian Pop (1880–1923), Austro-Hungarian and Romanian lawyer and politician
- Iulian Pop (footballer) (born 1907), Romanian footballer
- Jaap Pop (1941–2026), Dutch politician
- Liviu Pop (born 1974), Romanian politician
- Mihai Pop (1907–2000), Romanian ethnologist
- Mihail Pop (born 1955), Moldovan economist and politician
- Napoleon Pop (1945–2023), Romanian economist and politician
- Nicolae Pop (born 1951), Romanian volleyball player
- Ramona Pop (born 1977), German politician
- Ramona Pop (athlete) (born 1982), Romanian high jumper
- Rareș Pop (born 2005), Romanian footballer
- Sebastian Pop (abductee), Belizean kidnapping victim
- Simona Pop (born 1988), Romanian fencer
- Slađana Pop-Lazić (born 1988), Serbian handball player
- Ștefan Pop (born 1987), Romanian operatic tenor
- Stefan Pop (comedian) (born 1985), Dutch comedian
- Ștefan Cicio Pop (1865–1934), Austro-Hungarian and Romanian lawyer and politician
- Tudor Rareș Pop (born 1980), Romanian politician
- Vasile Pop (1789–1842), Austrian physician
- Vasile Pop (writer) (1875–1931), Romanian writer
- Vasile Lucian Pop (born 1989), Romanian footballer
- Virgiliu Pop (born 1974), Romanian space lawyer
- Vlad Pop (born 2000), Romanian footballer
- Willem Frederik Pop (1858–1931), Dutch military general
- Zach Pop (born 1996), Canadian baseball player

=== Pseudonyms ===
- Denniz Pop (1963–1998), Swedish DJ and music producer
- Iggy Pop (born 1947), American musician
- Jimmy Pop (born 1972), American musician
- Lizi Pop (born 2004), Georgian singer
- Lolly Pop (born 1975), American singer

=== Fictional characters ===
- Alina Pop, a character from the British soap opera Coronation Street

== See also ==
- Popescu, Romanian surname of similar etymology
