= Cristian Popescu =

Cristian Popescu may refer to:

- Cristian Popescu (poet) (1959–1995), Romanian poet
- Cristian Popescu Piedone (born 1963), Romanian politician
- Cristian Tudor Popescu (born 1956), Romanian journalist
- Cristian Dumitru Popescu (born 1964), Romanian-American mathematician
- Eugen-Cristian Popescu (born 1962), retired Romanian high jumper

== See also ==
- Popescu
