= Costin Murgescu =

Romanian economist, jurist, journalist, and diplomat (1919–1989)

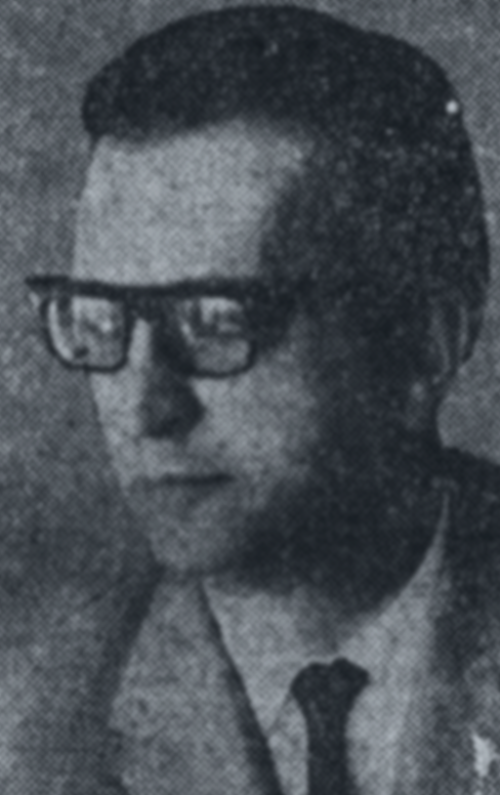
- Murgescu in September 1969
- Born: Constantin Ion Murgescu; October 27, 1919; Râmnicu Sărat, Kingdom of Romania
- Died: August 30, 1989 (aged 69)
- Other name: V. Borcea

Academic background
- Education: Bolyai University; Bucharest Academy of Economic Studies
- Influences: Petru Comarnescu, Dimitrie Gusti, Mihail Manoilescu, Victor Slăvescu, Gheorghe Zane

Academic work
- Era: 20th century
- School or tradition: Marxian economics; Marxist historiography; National communism; Supply-side economics
- Institutions: University of Bucharest; Institute of Economic Conjecture; Romanian Academy; Institute of South-East European Studies
- Main interests: Economic history, political economy, economic forecasting, management science, economic sociology, political philosophy, Romanian literature
- Influenced: Victor Babiuc, Eugen Dijmărescu, Mugur Isărescu, Bogdan Murgescu, Napoleon Pop

Costin Ion Murgescu (Romanian pronunciation: [kosˈtin iˈon murˈdʒesku], birth name Constantin Ion Murgescu; October 27, 1919 – August 30, 1989) was a Romanian economist, jurist, journalist and diplomat. A supporter of fascism during his youth, he switched to communism by the end of World War II, and became an editor of the Communist Party daily organ, România Liberă. He taught at the University of Bucharest and worked for the Institute of Economic Conjecture. Having campaigned for multilateralism in world affairs as early as 1944, he helped to distance Romania from the Soviet Union after 1964, and later represented his country at the United Nations. He wrote extensively, publishing works on the effects of land reform and industrialization, on the history of economic thought, and on Romania's relations with the Comecon and the First World.

An innovator among the Romanian communist intellectual and professional elite, Murgescu spent his final decades questioning the assumptions of Marxian economics. At the Institute for World Economy, which later became a branch of the Romanian Academy, he trained a new generation of like-minded economists. Shortly before his death, he was involved in dissidence against the Nicolae Ceaușescu regime. Although he did not live long enough to witness the 1989 Revolution, he played an indirect part in shaping the economic policies to which the country turned in post-communism. The estranged son of Lieutenant Colonel Murgescu, a convicted war criminal, Costin Murgescu was married to Ecaterina Oproiu, a Romanian writer and social commentator. He was survived by his nephew and disciple, historian Bogdan Murgescu.

== Biography ==
=== Early life and fascist militancy ===
Born in Râmnicu Sărat, the future economist was the son of a Romanian Land Forces officer, Ion C. Murgescu, who was later in command if Vapniarka concentration camp. Young Murgescu was originally interested in jurisprudence, and entered the law faculty of the University of Bucharest. His beginnings were as a literary critic, with an essay on the literary and artistic life of Balcic. It was picked up by the magazine Familia, and deemed "interesting, but insufficient" by chroniclers at Revista Fundațiilor Regale. Aged nineteen, Murgescu wrote a historical work, about the trial of the Transylvanian Memorandum signatories. Around that time, he was also a staff writer for the Oradea literary newspaper, Noua Gazetă de Vest, where he conducted a questionnaire survey on the state of cultural life in the provinces of Greater Romania.

During the first years of World War II, Murgescu was a supporter of the fascist Iron Guard and, in his own definition, a theoretician of "totalitarian" politics. He began a collaboration with the newspaper Universul, where, as later recounted by his colleague Ștefan Baciu, he was one of the three staff writers who showed up for work wearing the Guard's green-colored shirts. He was also allegedly involved in brawls at the university. These pitted him against students such as Dan Amedeo Lăzărescu, who had defaced portraits of the Guard's founding father, Corneliu Zelea Codreanu. Starting in August 1940, a full month before the Guard proclaimed its National Legionary regime, Murgescu published a series of political musings in Universul, as well as in periodicals such as Buna Vestire. These were soon after collected as a brochure, Note pentru Statul Totalitar ("Notes on the Totalitarian State").

The general conclusion of the work, partly based on direct quotations from Mein Kampf, was that totalitarianism, moving beyond authoritarian regimes and their "everyday ephemera", was centered on the promise of a "new man"—whose creation would both rehabilitate humanity and change history "for eternity". As a literary chronicler at Universul, Constantin Fântâneru saw in Murgescu "that model of an author who will win people over to a doctrine simply by outlining clearly its ideas." In the official newspaper Țara, Nicolae Ciuceanu noted: "With this work, Mr Costin Murgescu has won himself a leading position in Romanian journalism, and this accomplishment is all the more important, given that the writer is presently just 24 years of age." The brochure quoted at length from the speeches of Benito Mussolini and Iron Guard leader Horia Sima. Envisaging the "new man" as "strong, lively, and immaculate", it called for a non-violent "moral revolution" to bring Romania into the "New European Order". It sought to rebuild culture around the Guard's "Legionary spirit", and promised artistic freedom "only to ethnic Romanians." In his Universul chronicles, Murgescu offered his praise to both Codreanu and the military Conducător, Ion Antonescu. Moreover, he penned warnings against the Guard's enemies: "those who have martyred this People—no mercy for them. They should expect a terrible punishment." He still had contributions as a literary critic, such as a short introduction to Japanese poetry.

Murgescu remained active in the press after the Guard fell from power in the violent purge of early 1941. With Antonescu as the uncontested dictator, Romania became involved in the anti-Soviet war as an ally of Nazi Germany. Murgescu was drafted into the Romanian Land Forces, but continued to write (including an unpublished novel and war diary) and was allowed to pass his examinations at the university. With his journalistic work, he moved to the more mainstream review, Vremea, where he contributed analytical essays about the war effort. In one such piece, on October 25, 1942, just before the crushing of Romanian forces, he predicted that the Red Army was too exhausted and famished to mount an offensive. By 1943, his articles in Vremea and Revista Fundațiilor Regale were turning toward economics and economic history, citing Victor Slăvescu as a model and inspiration. Murgescu's father, Ion, had "strong pro-Nazi sympathies" and was a willing participant in Antonescu's war crimes. By September 1942, the elder Murgescu was the commandant of Vapniarka, a concentration camp for Jewish deportees, ordering them to be fed on grass pea, which caused an outbreak of lathyrism and resulted in several deaths and many more crippling infirmities.

=== Communist turn and România Liberă ===
In a 1987 article, L. Eșanu argues that Murgescu's participation in the left-wing resistance to Antonescu was already visible in January 1943, the alleged date at which the underground newspaper România Liberă had been set up. Eșanu includes Murgescu on a list of its founders. As noted by historian Lucian Boia, he had fully renounced his "juvenile totalitarian illusions" by January 1944, with Romania facing the possibility of a Soviet invasion. Finding himself in open conflict with his own father, Murgescu became a contributor to Ecoul, the semi-legal newspaper. It published his essays against Antonescu's economic policies and the New Order, which argued, with a noted "dialectical" tinge, in favor of multilateralism and an "international division of labor". His Vremea articles, arranged for print by the antifascist editor George Ivașcu, looked forward to a new era of peace, shaped by international cooperation. According to Boia, he may have been encouraged to explore the subject by the Propaganda Ministry, which was sending out signals that some dignitaries were willing to sue for peace.

During or immediately after the August 23 Coup which toppled Antonescu, Murgescu involved himself with left-wing political circles, including the Romanian Communist Party (PCR) and the Union of Patriots. The latter's newspaper, Tribuna Poporului, had him as an economic columnist from its first issue, on October 16. As a display of his loyalty to the new regime, he volunteered for war against the Nazis, fought in Northern Transylvania, and was badly wounded. He was a personal witness to the recapture of Târgu Mureș in October 1944, writing a România Liberă reportage on this subject. His piece on the taking on Cluj appeared in 1945, as part of a reportage collection curated by architect George Matei Cantacuzino.

From 1944 to 1952, that is to say during the early stages of the Romanian communist regime, Murgescu was editor of România Liberă, which had been taken over by the PCR. In this capacity, Murgescu, who generally used the pen name "V. Borcea", helped organize a bureau of national and international correspondents, as well as its agitprop section. He contributed various articles on national affairs and international relations, praising the 1945 visit to Moscow of the PCR Minister of Transport Gheorghe Gheorghiu-Dej as "a momentous start" in Soviet–Romanian relations. His own far-right engagement in the 1930s was the object of scrutiny by Dreptatea daily put out by the opposition National Peasants' Party. In April 1946 its correspondent, George Păun, listed Murgescu, George Macovescu and Dumitru Corbea as communist propagandists who had previously served the fascist cause. In late 1945, Murgescu was employed by the communized Propaganda Ministry and the Siguranța detectives, the latter of whom vetted him as a regime loyalist, noting his friendship with PCR activists such as Simion Oeriu and Grigore Preoteasa.

Invited by the Fatherland Front in neighboring Bulgaria, Murgescu witnessed first-hand the Bulgarian legislative elections on October 27, 1946; he was part of a journalists' delegation that also comprised Aurel Baranga, Paul Georgescu, Ștefan Tita, and Gheorghe Zaharia. Ahead of Romania's own elections in November, Murgescu played down Peasantist concerns about vote-rigging and intimidation, and declared such claims to be part of a ploy against the leftist parties in government. His statements were polemically reviewed by Dreptatea, which introduced him as bine [sic] cunoscutul legionar ("that notorious Guardist"). He was also a prominent contributor to the communist literary magazine, Contemporanul, where he praised the party for its "consolidation of democracy". His first theoretical work appeared in 1947, outlining his belief that the new economic regime would be based on the development of heavy industry. In August 1948, Veac Nou magazine, put out by the Romanian Society for Friendship with the Soviet Union, featured his article on Soviet–Romanian economic cooperation, rendering his belief that Soviet backing was crucial for both Romania's industrial development and her consolidation as a "people's democracy".

Around 1950, Murgescu married Ecaterina Oproiu, a fellow România Liberă journalist who went on to establish the official film magazine, Cinema. She later achieved fame in her own right, as Romania's first-ever television critic and a promoter of socialist feminism. Following the country's change of orientation, Murgescu's father had found himself arrested, and appeared before the Romanian People's Tribunals in April 1945. He was initially sentenced to death, and some authors believe that he was executed. However, his sentence was commuted to life imprisonment with hard labor on June 1, 1945. Passing through the notorious Aiud prison, he may have still been alive during the mid-1950s.

=== ICE research ===
Expelled from România Liberă following an inquiry into his social origins, and having to explain his attitude toward his father the war criminal, Murgescu focused entirely on his work in economics. From 1953 to 1956, he was a scientific researcher in the political economy department of the University of Bucharest. He later joined the team of economists and statisticians at the Institute of Economic Conjecture (ICE), located in Bucharest. This institution was headed by Gogu Rădulescu, a disgraced and sidelined PCR activist. Rădulescu appointed Murgescu head of the National Economy Section, and deputy ICE Director. At the time, the ICE also offered employment to the formerly repressed scholar Gheorghe Zane, who was protected by the PCR eminence Alexandru Bârlădeanu and who, as Murgescu put it, was thus allowed to continue his interwar research, with input from "dialectical materialism".

Murgescu himself was assigned to work on an economic overview of the 1945 land reform, which he published in 1956 at Editura Academiei. Writing at the time, Marxist philosopher Ernő Gáll suggested that Murgescu's tract offered "rich and convincing material" about the pauperization of Romania's peasant class before and during World War II. As noted in 2009 by scholars Dorin Dobrincu and Constantin Iordachi, the study, written "during the Stalinist years", has "limited analytical value", but still stands out as the only land reform monograph in "domestic historical writing" under communism. As noted by historian Cristian Vasile, Murgescu's work was politicized, and presented praise of Gheorghiu-Dej, now the regime leader, voiced in terms similar to his earlier panegyrics for Codreanu. In his private conversations with a colleague, G. Iosub, he "complain[ed] that the executive power never took his forecasts into account, that no minister would even glance over them." By the end of the 1950s, with a slight relaxation of communist censorship, he tried to promote a reevaluation of interwar Romanian sociology, and organized at the ICE work-groups that were basing themselves on Dimitrie Gusti's sociological research teams.

These rural expeditions, recounted by Murgescu's articles in Contemporanul (August 1957), allowed for a discussion of collectivization, which they presented as a relevant success (particularly so in the model regions of Constanța and Hunedoara). Also in Contemporanul, Murgescu published an essay that sought to rehabilitate Gusti, but his effort was smothered by the Communist Party in 1959. At the ICE in 1958, he came into conflict with his superior Miron Constantinescu, and was afterward demoted to department head. According to fellow economist Egon Balas, Murgescu was also able to use political censorship for his own gains, "manufacturing a conflict" with Constantinescu, who was a somewhat dissenting communist, and obtaining his ousting. As a result of this intrigue, Murgescu became sole editor of the ICE academic journal, Revista Economică, in 1958. He also resumed his position as second director, but was placed under tight surveillance by Securitate agents in 1959; according to Vasile, he was most likely recruited as a Securitate informant (code name "Barbu Rîmniceanu"), and tasked with reporting on the activities of former fascists such as Bucur Țincu and Ion Veverca. His position at the Institute mirrored that of Ion Rachmuth—an unusual situation in which a former Guardist and a Jewish man, once exposed to racial persecution, had to report to each other on a daily basis.

Making occasional returns to the field of Marxist economic history, Murgescu wrote propaganda works, accusing the deposed Romanian royal family, and in particular Carol II, of having organized a "plunder" of Romanian assets. In 1960, the anticommunist Romanian diaspora stood accused by the communists of covering up for fascism. In reply, the Paris-based magazine La Nation Roumaine published ample revelations about the fascist past of Murgescu, Mihai Ralea, Mihu Dragomir, and various other figures of the new regime. Also in 1960, Murgescu and N. N. Constantinescu were editors of a major economic history tract, Contribuții la istoria capitalului străin în Romînia ("Contributions to the History of Foreign Capital in Romania"). This work, also put out by Editura Academiei, was revisited some 20 years later by historian Vasile Bogza, who noted that, despite some flawed interpretations, it remained one of the "thorough studies" in the field. A University of Bucharest professor, Murgescu was received as a corresponding member of the Romanian Academy in 1963, earning a doctorate in economics from the Bucharest Academy of Economic Studies in 1964. He also served the Institute of South-East European Studies as an academic supervisor for its Revue des Études Sud-est Européenes.

=== National communism ===
By 1963, Murgescu was called upon by the regime to inform the world about Romania's economic ideology, which was increasingly de-satellized, and altogether different from Soviet policies. That year, he denounced the Comecon's "pseudo-theories" on industrialization, which seemed to offer Romania a subservient economic position within the common market. In 1964, the PCR leadership called upon Murgescu to publish an even more virulent official reply against the Soviets and the Comecon. By advancing a "Valev Plan", the Soviets had suggested that Romania become an agricultural hinterland for the more industrialized socialist countries. Murgescu's selection by the regime was an implicit recognition of his scholarly authority; his critique of the Valev proposal also announced a new political stage, of national communism. His articles called for a reform of the Comecon, and, defying the Sino-Soviet split, suggested the accession of China.

With the inauguration of Nicolae Ceaușescu as Party Secretary, and later President of Romania, Murgescu had more opportunities to expand on his economic theories. Serving only as ICE department head from 1965, he continued to edit Revista Economică to 1968, then Revista Română de Relații Internaționale (from 1968 to 1970). In parallel, he was taken on as an adviser by Ion Gheorghe Maurer, who was serving as President of the Council of Ministers. In 1967, he declared his new interest in exploring "national specificity", commending the old-regime intellectuals Zane and Petru Comarnescu for their work in that field. He also partook in the effort to reassess Mihail Manoilescu as the interwar doctrinaire of economic nationalism, and is regarded by economist Dan Popescu as Manoilescu's intellectual heir. From June 1969, he had a Tuesday evening show on Radio Romania, as part of the series Tableta de Seară, which also featured, among others, actor Radu Beligan, mathematician Grigore Moisil, writer Marin Sorescu, and literary scholar Edgar Papu.

Murgescu moved from ICE to the Institute for World Economy (IEM), where he worked from 1970 until his death, and was for a while its director. In 1976, he was elected vice president of the International Marketing Federation. The Romanian position regarding the Comecon was given expression in a 1969 tract România socialistă și cooperarea internațională ("Socialist Romania and International Cooperation"), which came out at Editura Politică with Murgescu, Mircea Malița and Gheorghe Surpat as the three authors. In 1971, the same venue put out Murgescu's tract on team management within the socialist economy, which he theorized as a function of democratic centralism. In 1974, he published, at Editura Meridiane, the French-language introduction L'economie socialiste en Roumanie ("Romania's Socialist Economy"). It explained the regime's policy of cooperating with the West in industrial development and scientific research, noting that socialist economies had to catch up with capitalism before the latter could experience a final crisis. According to Canadian economist Jeanne Kirk Laux, Murgescu was trying to reconcile Romania's relations with multinational corporations with Ceaușescu's "national sovereignty obsession". Indirectly, the book documents the regime's efforts to compensate for the high price of Western technology by proposing various methods of counter trade (methods which, Kirk Laux notes, Murgescu claimed as original Romanian contributions to the theory of international trade).

Murgescu was particularly interested in Romanian economic history in relation to the global economy, and a pioneer of interdisciplinarity. In 1967, he returned to sociology by contributing to a collective study on "the effects of industrialization on social mobility". He was again focused on exposing the old monarchic system as a vehicle for economic fraud—his 1970 tract about the royal family's role in market manipulation was welcomed by Alexandru Puiu in the communist paper Scînteia Tineretului. As argued by Puiu, the book was one of "irreproachable scientific standing", though also a minute exposé of a robbery "in all its ugliness." In 1972, Murgescu put out a "biography of ideas" for David Ricardo, analyzed within the larger context of the Industrial Revolution.

During early 1977, the School of International and Public Affairs in New York City played host to a delegation of Romanian historians, including Murgescu, Virgil Cândea, Constantin C. Giurescu, Ștefan Pascu, and the President's brother, Ilie Ceaușescu. Their lectures were picketed by protestors who argued that national communism was a form of Stalinism, and that it directly threatened the community life of Hungarians in Romania. With Damian Hurezeanu, Murgescu was a guest of the 15th International Congress of Historical Sciences (Bucharest, 1980), where they presented a new synthesis of land reform policies in interwar Romania. A Romanian Ambassador to the United Nations in the early 1980s, Murgescu also served for a while as ECOSOC President. He published his notes on the New International Economic Order in Partners in East-West Economic Relations, a collection of studies edited by Zoltán Fallenbüchl and C. H. McMillan for Pergamon Press. They outlined Romania's support for the New International Economic Order and her critique of the Soviet Union. As Murgescu argued, the Soviet economy was to be taxed the same as a capitalist developed country when contributing to the United Nations Development Programme.

=== Dissidence, death, and legacy ===
Murgescu followed up with several studies of his own. In 1980, he put together Zane's complete works, with his own preface. His effort was praised by Cândea, who recommended that Murgescu expand his contribution into a Zane monograph. The series also includes his signature work, Mersul ideilor economice la români ("The Development of Economic Ideas among the Romanians"), appearing as two volumes—in 1987 and 1990, respectively. The initial volume was welcomed by literary critic Mihai Ungheanu as a contribution to the "necessary recovery of Romanian values in social and economic thinking"—alongside contributions by Ilie Bădescu and Ion Ungureanu. The work was instead met with criticism by the literary sociologist Zigu Ornea, sparking a debate which was to be Murgescu's last.

Upon accessing Murgescu's Securitate file in the 2010, historian Narcis Tulbure concluded that the ICE doubled as a Securitate hub, providing operation cover to spies of the Foreign Intelligence Directorate. He notes that most of these, including Isărescu, were not trained in econometrics, and that their expertise needs to be treated with "great caution"; Tulbure also proposes that more genuine economic experts could be found among Manea Mănescu's associates at the Cybernetics Faculty, but also that these had been sidelined, on Ceaușescu's orders, after 1977. Isărescu himself reports that Murgescu spent the last stage of his life as a dissident, in latent conflict with President Ceaușescu. At the IEM, he helped organize debates about politics and economics, introduced Romanian students to the core notions of supply-side economics, and made hints about the need for profound change.

Murgescu's 1982 work on the Japanese economic miracle was done from personal observations from his extended trip there; overall, he concluded that Japanese companies had fully focused on technological innovation, and had planned ahead with a focus on such changes. It was a Romanian best-seller. Allegedly, Murgescu had come to believe that the Valev Plan was a consistent form of economic integration, and that national communism was essentially flawed. Foreign Minister Ștefan Andrei shielded Murgescu from Ceaușescu's anger, and allowed him to maintain a link with the West through contacts with Reuters. Another inner-PCR dissident and former diplomat, Silviu Brucan, indicated Murgescu as one of his main sources for critical reports which were sent to foreign ambassadors in Romania.

Murgescu died a few months before the anti-communist Revolution of December 1989. He was buried at Bellu Cemetery on September 2. Obituary pieces included one by Ornea. He quoted Murgescu's letter to him, in which the economist had applauded any constructive debate between "men of culture". Murgescu had left several unpublished texts, including parts of a sequel to Mersul ideilor, but also Drumul oilor ("The Sheep's Road"), which detailed the economic history of sheep farming in Romania. The latter text was carried in a December 1990 issue of Academica journal, with an introduction by Mircea Măciu (in turn criticized in Contemporanul for stretching Murgescu's conclusions, and for using the "wooden language" of official Marxism).

Murgescu was survived by his wife, Ecaterina Oproiu, who went on to serve as a Presidential appointee on a visual media regulatory agency, the National Audiovisual Council, between 1992 and 2000. Murgescu's nephew, Bogdan Murgescu, also trained in economic history, and achieved notoriety for his analysis of economic backwardness. He credits Costin Murgescu as an early influence on his own work. Mersul ideilor, reissued by the National Bank of Romania presses in 1994, was complemented by the posthumous Drumurile unității românești ("The Paths of Romanian Unity", 1996). As a learning institution, the IEM was the alma mater of economists who rose to political prominence after 1989, among them Eugen Dijmărescu, Mugur Isărescu, Napoleon Pop, and Victor Babiuc. In 1990, it was renamed the "Costin Murgescu Institute of World Economy", becoming part of the Romanian Academy network. According to Isărescu: "At the Institute for World Economy, professor Costin Murgescu was able to fulfill his calling on many levels. Constantly preoccupied with establishing a Romanian school of economic research, he turned [the IEM] into a veritable creative workshop." As noted in 2010 by sociologist Zoltán Rostás, Murgescu's "sinuous youth" was "hardly mentioned", "but [he] was nearly sanctified by the elite of economists who are now in their sixties."
