= Popescu =

Popescu (Francisized as Popesco) is a family name common in Romania (derived from popă, meaning priest). Notable people with the surname include:

- Dimitrie Batova (born Dimitrie Popescu; 1909–1942), writer, politician, and soldier
- Adrian Popescu (born 1960), football (soccer) player
- Alexandru Candiano-Popescu (1841–1901), soldier, journalist, and political conspirator
- Călin Popescu-Tăriceanu (born 1952), politician
- Cezar Popescu (born 1976), rugby union player
- Constantin Popescu, politician
- Corneliu M. Popescu (1958–1977), poet and translator
- Cosmin Alin Popescu (born 1974), university rector
- Cristian Popescu (poet) (c. 1959–1995), poet
- Cristian Dumitru Popescu (born 1964), Romanian-American mathematician
- Cristian Tudor Popescu (born 1956), journalist and writer
- Cristian Popescu Piedone (born 1963), politician
- Dan Popescu (born 1988), comic book artist
- Dan Ioan Popescu (born 1948), politician
- Daniel Popescu, footballer
- David Popescu (1886–1955), soldier and politician
- Dimitrie Popescu (1961–2023), rower
- Dumitru Radu Popescu (1935–2023), writer and communist activist
- Elvira Popescu (1894–1993), actress
- Eufrosina Marcolini (born Eufrosina Popescu, 1821–1900), actress and singer
- Eugen-Cristian Popescu (born 1962), high jumper
- Florin Popescu (born 1974), canoer
- Gabriel Popescu (footballer) (born 1973), football player
- Gabriel Popescu (scientist) (1971–2022), scientist and engineer
- Gheorghe Cartianu-Popescu (1907–1982), engineer
- Gheorghe Popescu (footballer, born 1919) (1919–2001), football (soccer) player
- Gheorghe Popescu (footballer, born 1967), football (soccer) player
- Ilie Daniel Popescu (born 1983), artistic gymnast
- Ion Popescu-Gopo (1923–1989), animator and cartoonist
- Irinel Popescu (born 1953), surgeon
- Liliana Popescu (born 1982), middle-distance runner
- Lucian Popescu (1912–1982), boxer
- Maria Popesco (1919–2004), victim of an alleged Swiss judicial error
- Marioara Popescu (born 1962), rower
- Mihai Popescu (born 1985), handballer
- Mircea Popescu, British engineer
- Mircea Popescu (table tennis), Romanian table tennis player
- Mitică Popescu (1936–2023), actor
- Moș Ion Popescu (1902–1956), pseudonym of writer Ion Călugăru
- N. D. Popescu-Popnedea (1843–1921), writer
- Nicolae Popescu (1937–2010), mathematician
- Nicu Popescu (born 1981), diplomat
- Rodica Popescu Bitănescu (born 1938), actress
- Sandu Popescu, Physicist (quantum information)
- Spiridon Popescu (1864–1933), writer
- Ştefan Popescu (born 1993), painter
- Stela Popescu (1935–2017), actress
- Stelian Popescu (1874–1954), journalist and fascist activist
- Vasile Popescu (1925–2003), painter
- Vlad Popescu (born 1989), politician

== See also ==
- Pop (surname), Romanian surname of similar etymology
