= Stefan Pop =

Stefan Pop may refer to:

- Ștefan Pop, a Romanian operatic tenor
- Stefan Pop (comedian), a Dutch comedian and actor
