= Alexandru Pop =

Alexandru Pop may refer to:

- Alexandru Pop (rugby union) (born 1945), Romanian rugby union player
- Alexandru Pop (footballer, born 2000) (born 2000), Romanian footballer
