= Râmnicu Vâlcea =

- Municipality
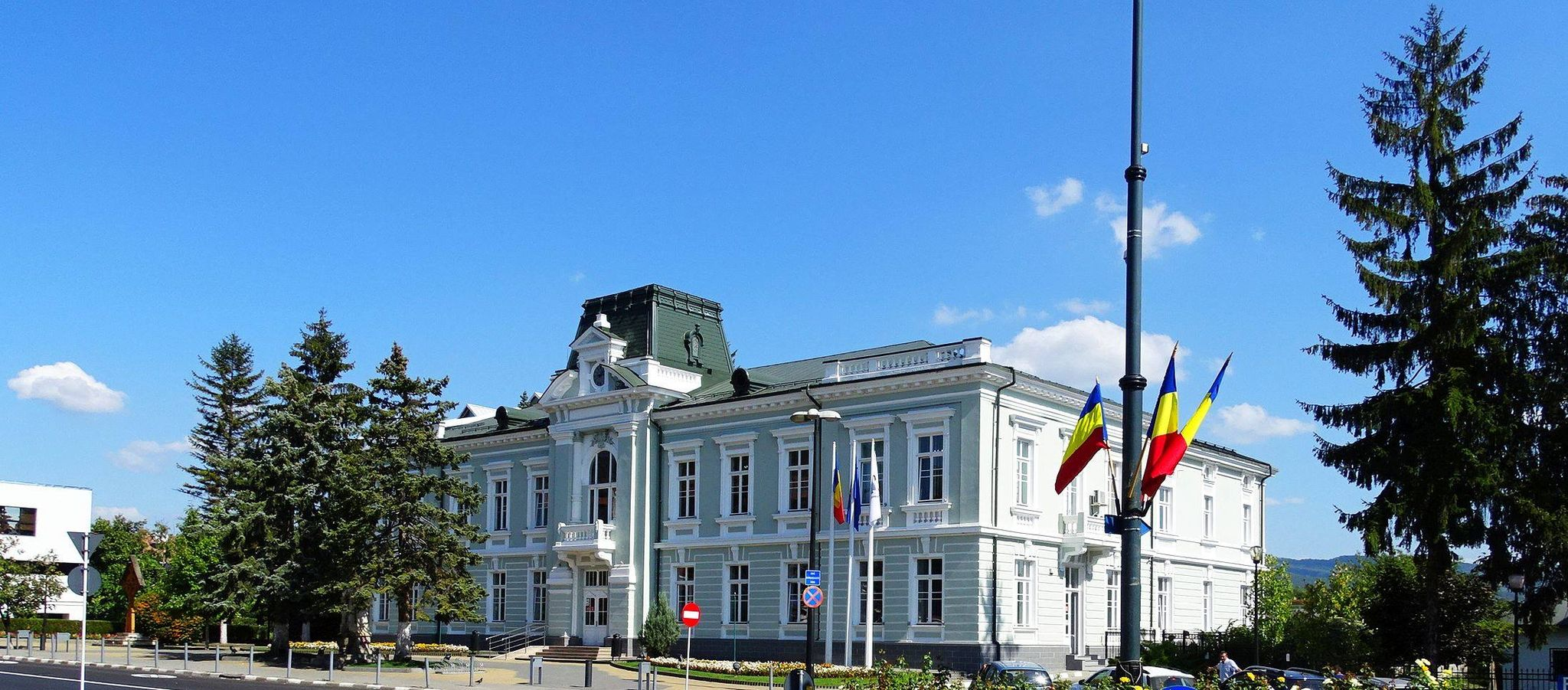
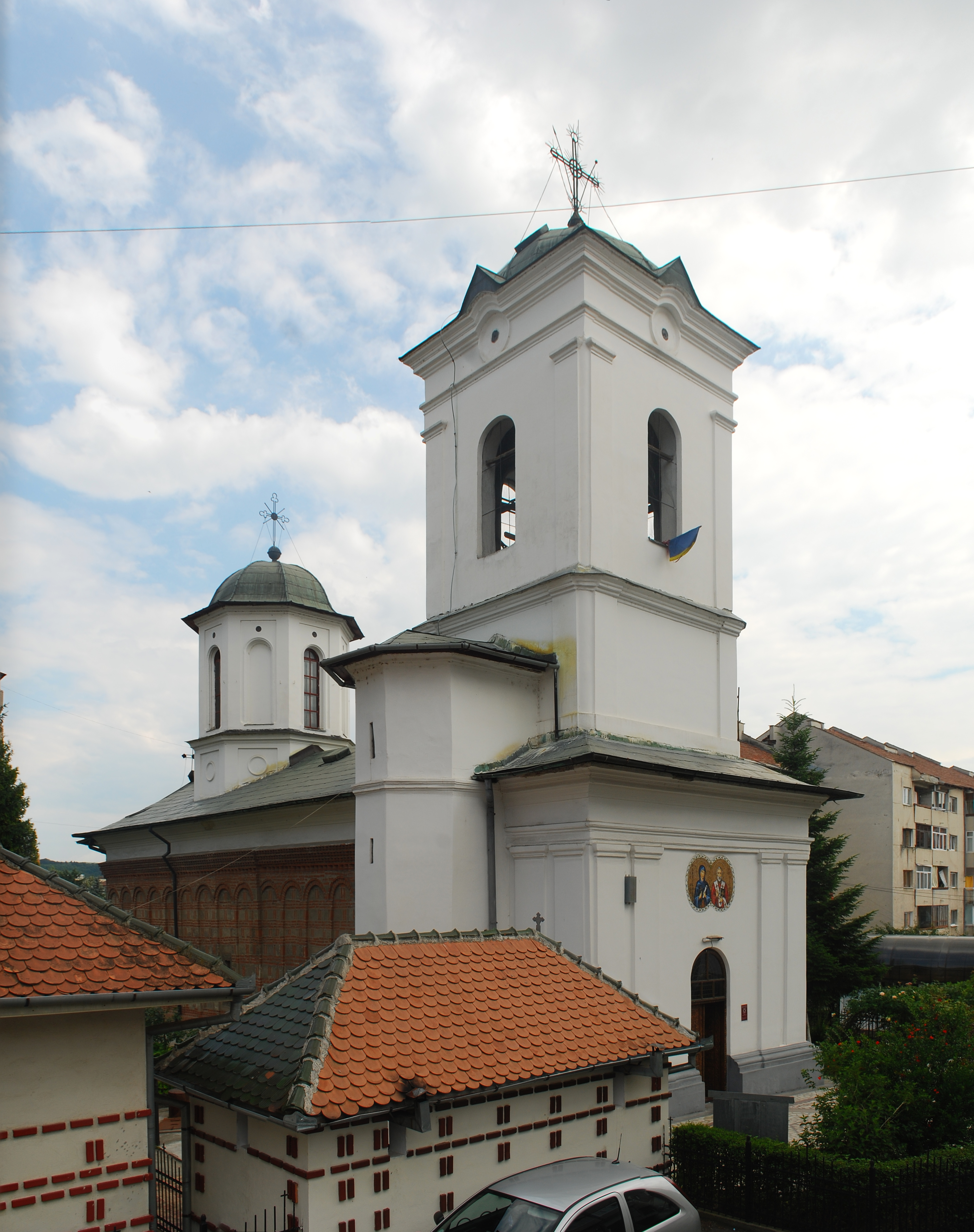
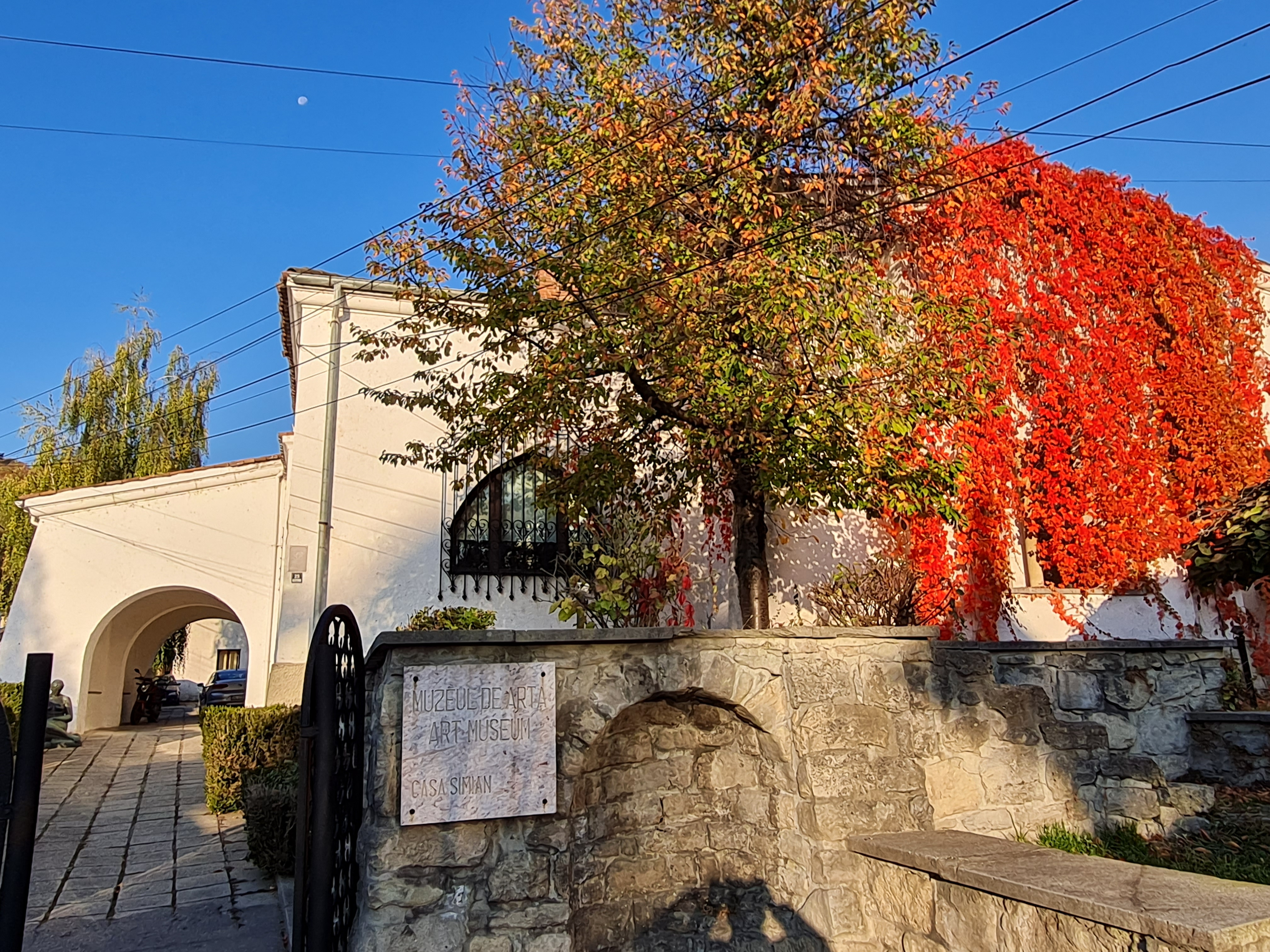
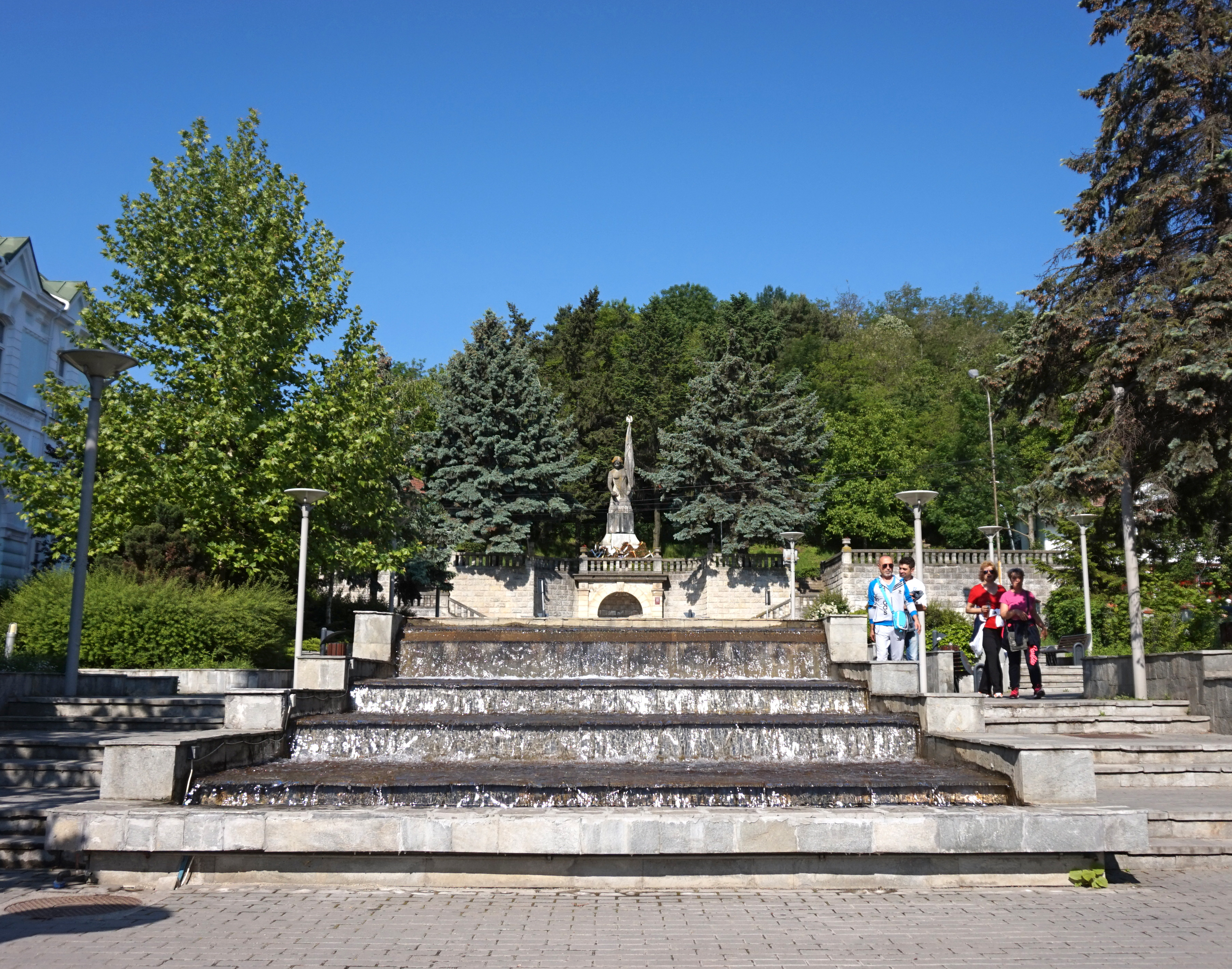
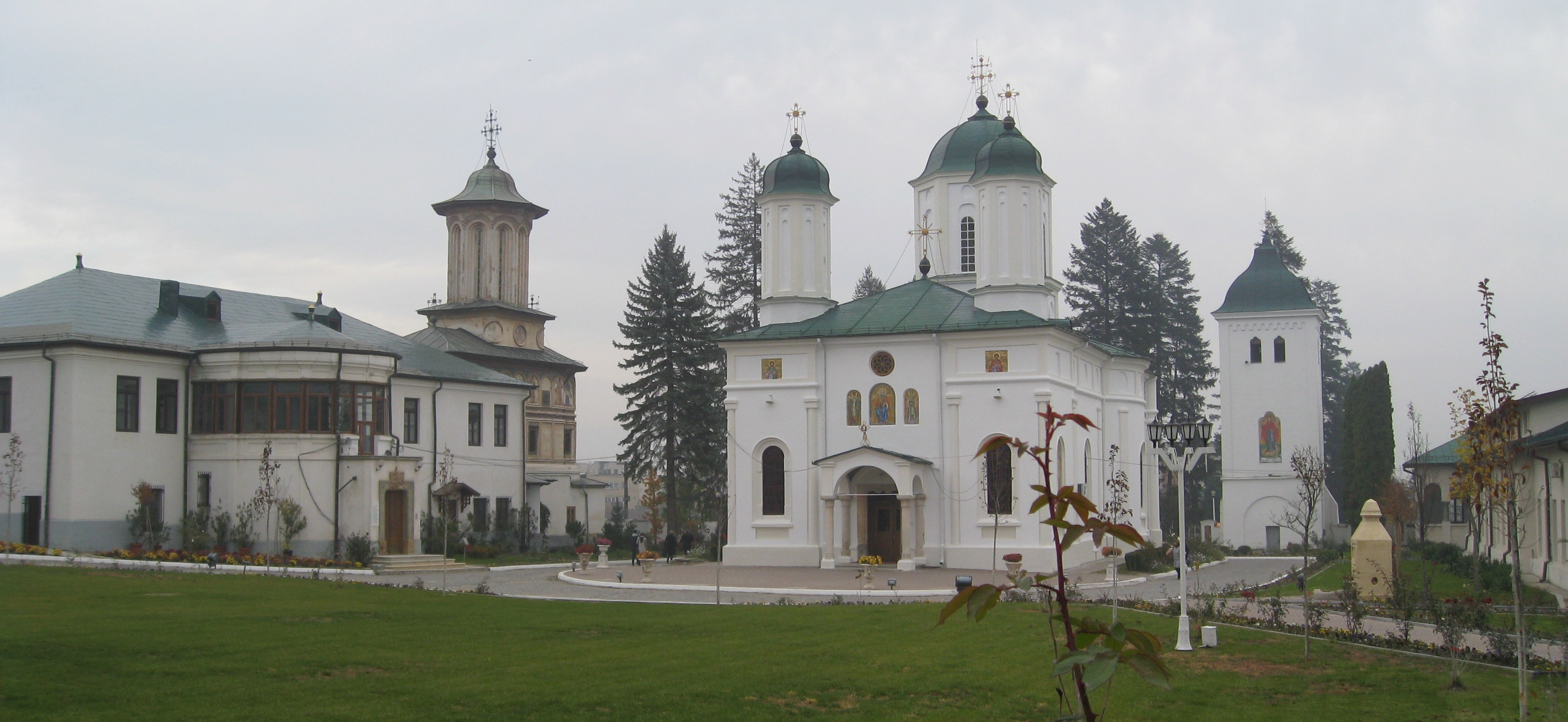
- City Hall Saint Paraskeva's church Art Museum Independence Monument Râmnicu Vâlcea Cathedral

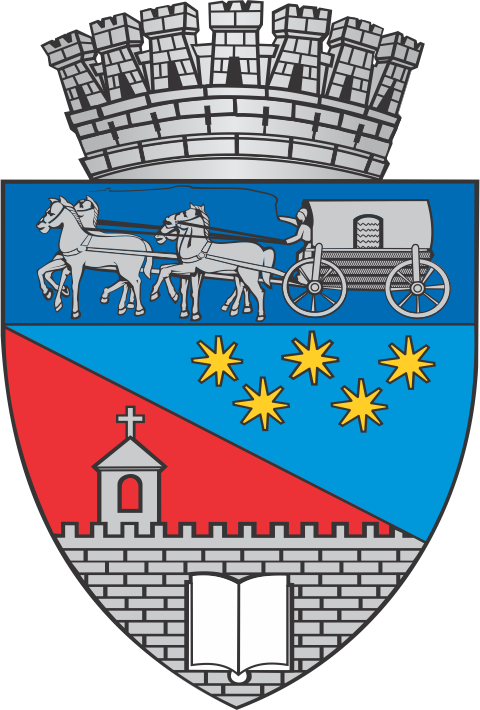
- Coat of arms

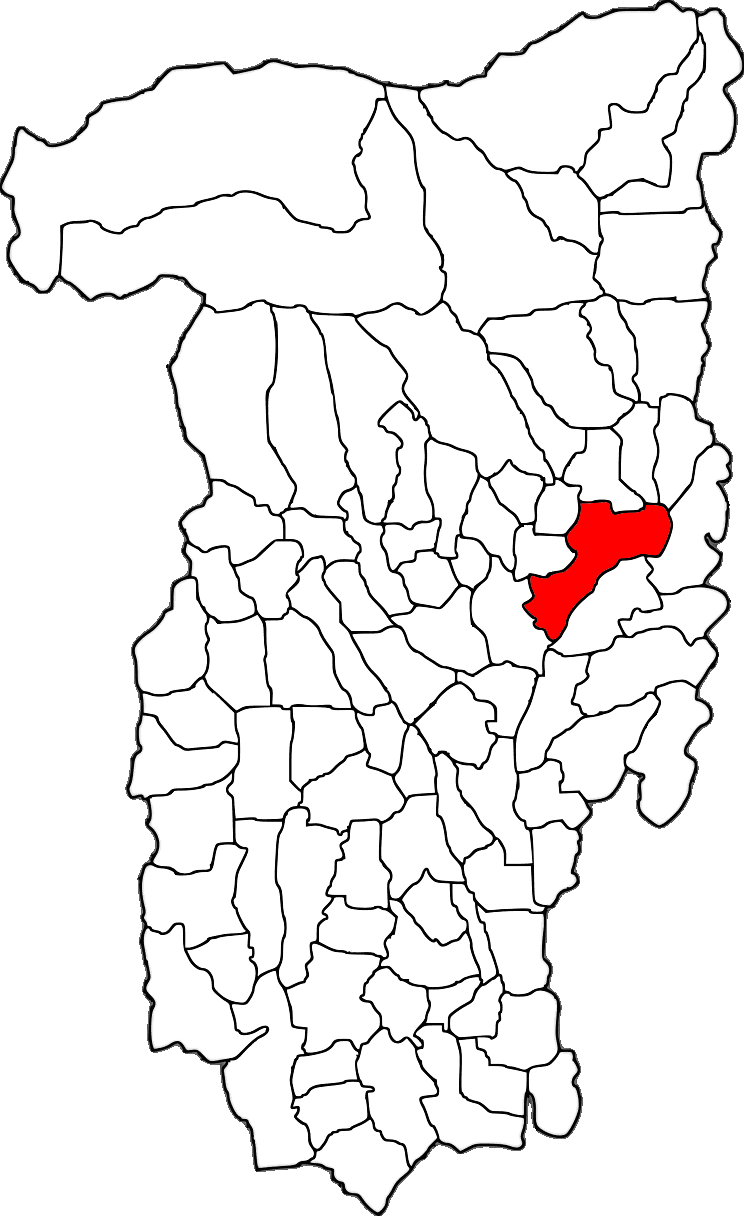
- Location in Vâlcea County

- Location in Romania
- Coordinates: 45°6′17″N 24°22′32″E
- Country: Romania
- County: Vâlcea
- Established: 1388 (first mention)

Government
  - Mayor (2024–2028): Mircia Gutău (PSD)
- Area: 89.52 km^{2} (34.56 sq mi)
- Elevation: 250 m (820 ft)
- Population (2021-12-01): 93,151
  - Density: 1,041/km^{2} (2,695/sq mi)
- Time zone: UTC+02:00 (EET)
  - Summer (DST): UTC+03:00 (EEST)
- Postal code: 240xxx
- Area code: (+40) 02 50
- Vehicle reg.: VL
- Website: www.primariavl.ro

Râmnicu Vâlcea (formerly Râmnic, Romanian pronunciation: [ˈrɨmniku ˈvɨlt͡ʃe̯a]) is a city in Romania. Located in the south-central part of the country, in the historical province of Oltenia, it is the seat of Vâlcea County and its main urban settlement. According to the 2021 Romanian census, it has a population of 93,151.

== Geography ==
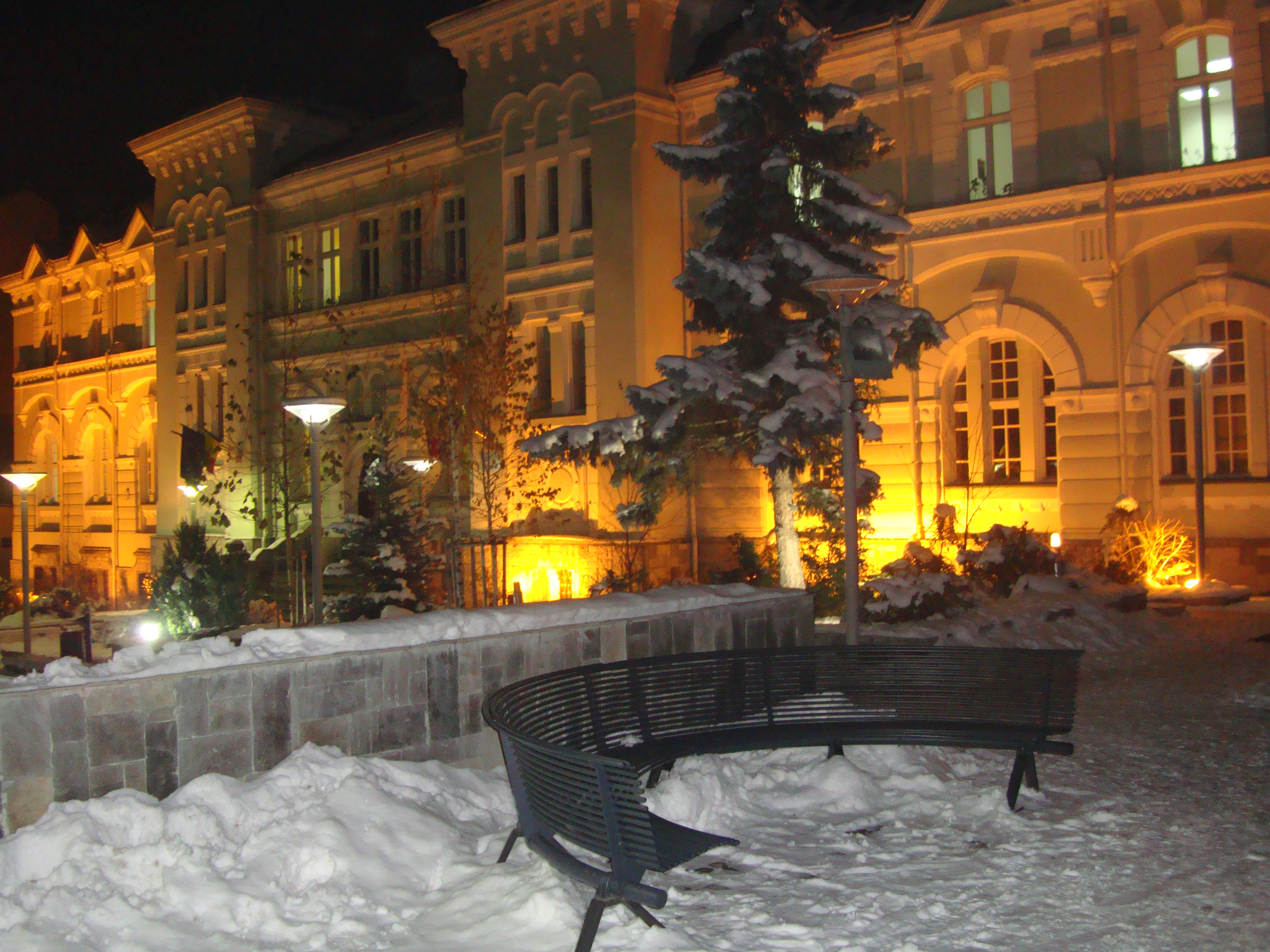
The town centre of Râmnicu Vâlcea in winter (December 2010)

Râmnicu Vâlcea is situated in the central-southwestern area of Romania and is the county capital of Vâlcea County. Set at the foothills of the Southern Carpathians, the town is located at about 12 kilometres (7.5 mi) from the Cozia Mountains and about 40 km (25 mi) from the Făgăraș and Lotrului Mountains. The southern limit of the city is formed by the Getic Plateau (Romanian: Platoul Getic) and the Olt River valley.

The city is crossed by national roads DN7 (part of European route E81), DN64, and DN67. The Râmnicu Vâlcea railway station serves the CFR Line 201, which runs along the Olt River from Podu Olt, Sibiu County, to Piatra-Olt, Olt County.

=== Climate ===
According to Köppen climate classification, the climate of the town is defined as Dfa (humid continental with hot summers) bordering Cfa (humid subtropical). Precipitation amount is higher in the summer, although not high enough in order to be a "Dwa" type climate, winters are not dry enough for Dwa classification, either. There are on average 30.3 days annually with snow depth reaching or exceeding 1 cm (0.39 in).

The table below highlights climate data for Râmnicu Vâlcea between 1991 and 2020, detailing the average high temperature, the average low temperature, the average precipitation (in mm/inches) as well as the sum of mean monthly sunshine hours.

Climate data for Râmnicu Vâlcea (1991–2020, extremes 1981-present)
Month	Jan	Feb	Mar	Apr	May	Jun	Jul	Aug	Sep	Oct	Nov	Dec	Year
Record high °C (°F)	21.2 (70.2)	24.7 (76.5)	28.3 (82.9)	34.2 (93.6)	36.4 (97.5)	40.6 (105.1)	40.6 (105.1)	40.7 (105.3)	36.0 (96.8)	32.6 (90.7)	25.2 (77.4)	19.8 (67.6)	40.7 (105.3)
Mean daily maximum °C (°F)	4.4 (39.9)	7.2 (45.0)	12.4 (54.3)	18.3 (64.9)	23.4 (74.1)	27.2 (81.0)	29.4 (84.9)	29.5 (85.1)	24.1 (75.4)	17.8 (64.0)	10.9 (51.6)	5.3 (41.5)	17.5 (63.5)
Daily mean °C (°F)	−0.4 (31.3)	1.6 (34.9)	6.2 (43.2)	11.7 (53.1)	16.7 (62.1)	20.5 (68.9)	22.4 (72.3)	22.1 (71.8)	16.9 (62.4)	11.4 (52.5)	5.9 (42.6)	0.9 (33.6)	11.3 (52.3)
Mean daily minimum °C (°F)	−4.0 (24.8)	−2.4 (27.7)	1.4 (34.5)	6.4 (43.5)	11.0 (51.8)	14.7 (58.5)	16.3 (61.3)	16.3 (61.3)	11.8 (53.2)	7.1 (44.8)	2.4 (36.3)	−2.2 (28.0)	6.6 (43.9)
Record low °C (°F)	−22.9 (−9.2)	−22.9 (−9.2)	−18.6 (−1.5)	−5.2 (22.6)	0.7 (33.3)	4.0 (39.2)	7.1 (44.8)	3.5 (38.3)	1.7 (35.1)	−5.6 (21.9)	−12.3 (9.9)	−17.9 (−0.2)	−22.9 (−9.2)
Average precipitation mm (inches)	38.7 (1.52)	30.3 (1.19)	39.9 (1.57)	57.4 (2.26)	82.0 (3.23)	100.7 (3.96)	83.7 (3.30)	77.7 (3.06)	58.3 (2.30)	58.6 (2.31)	49.1 (1.93)	51.4 (2.02)	727.8 (28.65)
Average precipitation days (≥ 1.0 mm)	5.9	5.3	6.4	7.7	9.9	9.8	7.3	6.8	6.2	6.2	6.2	6.8	84.5
Mean monthly sunshine hours	90.1	111.3	157.3	185.9	233.8	260.1	289.1	274.2	201.8	156.0	96.4	72.7	2,128.7
Source 1: NOAA
Source 2: Meteomanz (extremes since 2021)

== History ==
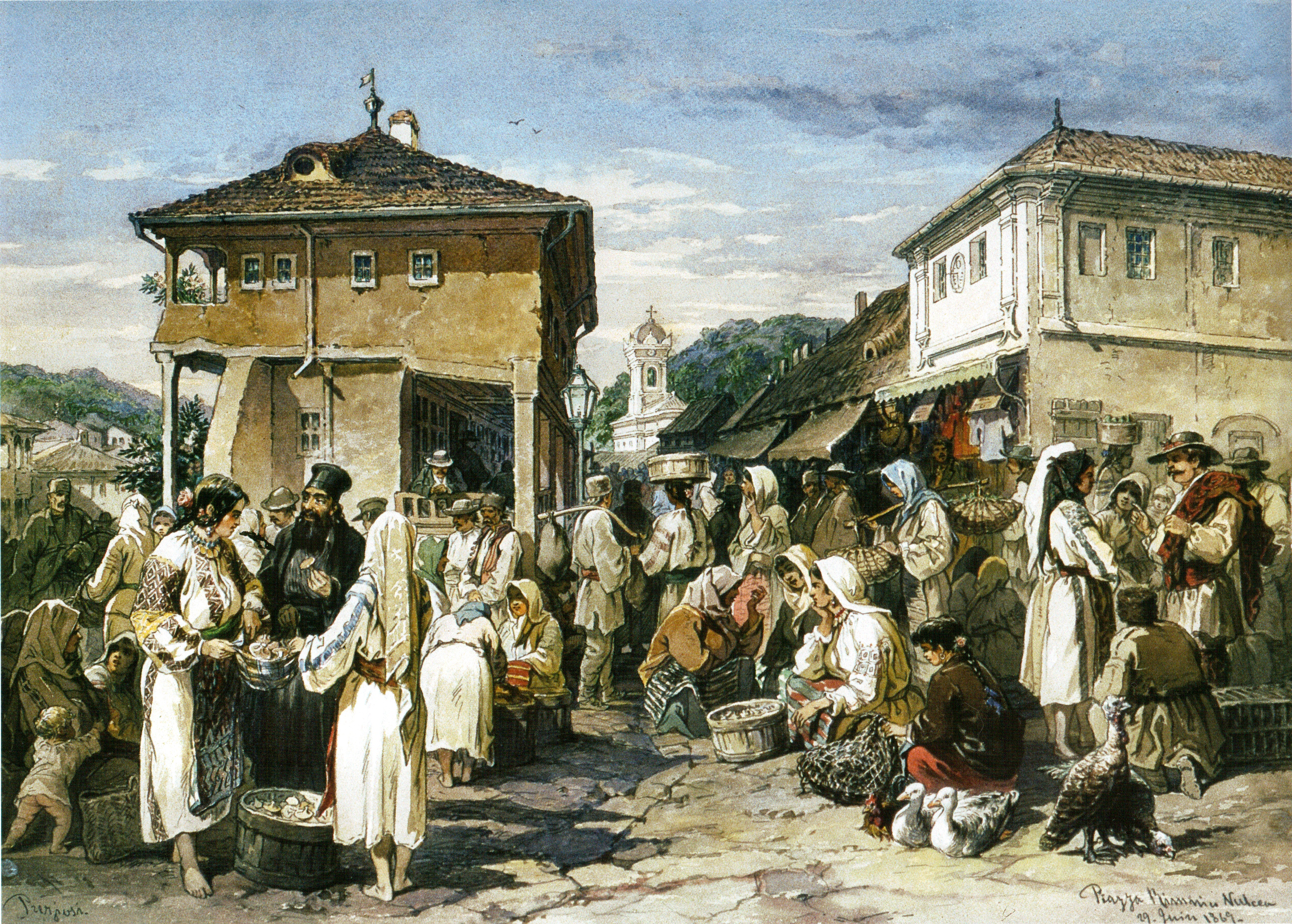
A market in Râmnicu Vâlcea, 1869 watercolor by Amedeo Preziosi

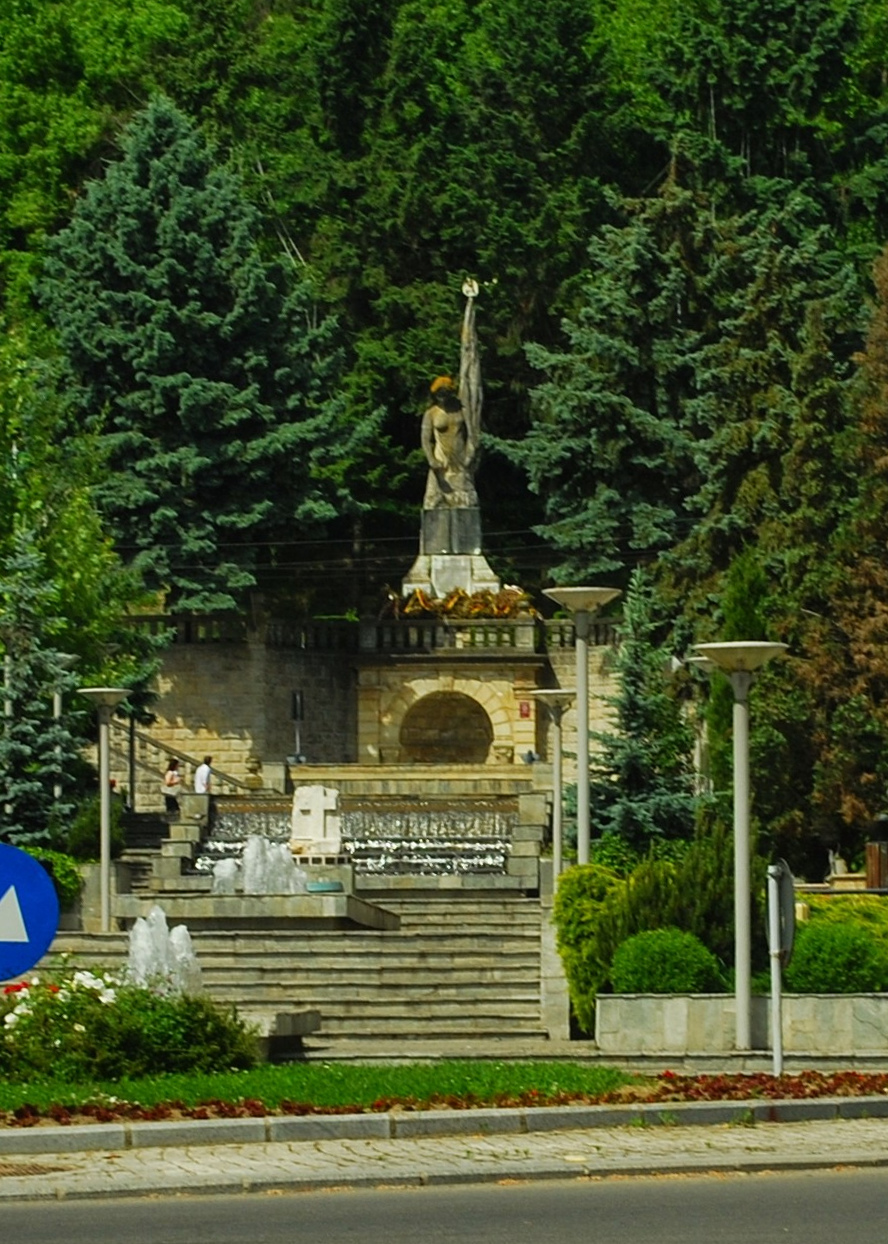
Romanian War of Independence monument (erected 1915)

Historical population
Year	Pop.	±%
1912	9,628	—
1930	15,648	+62.5%
1948	17,238	+10.2%
1956	18,984	+10.1%
1966	23,867	+25.7%
1977	66,321	+177.9%
1992	113,624	+71.3%
2002	107,656	−5.3%
2011	92,573	−14.0%
2021	93,151	+0.6%
Source: Romanian census data

The area has been inhabited since Dacian and Roman times, and was the site of a castrum (known as Buridava or Burridava, previously a Dacian town). A new fortress was built on the location during the Middle Ages. Râmnicu Vâlcea was first attested during the rule of Prince Mircea cel Bătrân, as "the princely town of Râmnic" (4 September 1388), and confirmed as the seat of a Vâlcea County during the same period (8 January 1392).

The town seal dates to 1505. Cetățuia, the actual fortress, served as the residence of Oltenian Bans and, from 1504, of the Orthodox bishops of the Râmnic Diocese; in 1529, Prince Radu of Afumați was killed in Cetățuia by a boyar conspiracy.

During the rules of Matei Basarab and Constantin Brâncoveanu, it became an important cultural center. It was here where the first paper mill and printing press in Romania were built (see Anthim the Iberian). The town was heavily damaged during the Habsburg monarchy's takeover of Oltenia which lasted between 1718 and 1739, and its purpose was again reduced to that of a fortress.

During the Wallachian Revolution, on 29 July 1848, Deșteaptă-te, române! (the current national anthem of Romania), with lyrics written by Andrei Mureșanu and music composed by Anton Pann (whose memorial house lies in the center of the town), was sung for the first time in Râmnicu Vâlcea.

Gheorghe Magheru gathered his military force in Râureni, now part of the town, in an attempt to face the anti-revolutionary forces of Imperial Russia and the Ottoman Empire.

In the 1980s, the town was completely rebuilt in a style combining socialist realism with local vernacular architecture of Brâncovenesc style.

The town was the center and peak point of the path of total darkness of the Solar eclipse of 11 August 1999. Around 2005, the town gained notoriety as a centre of cybercrime.

== Politics ==
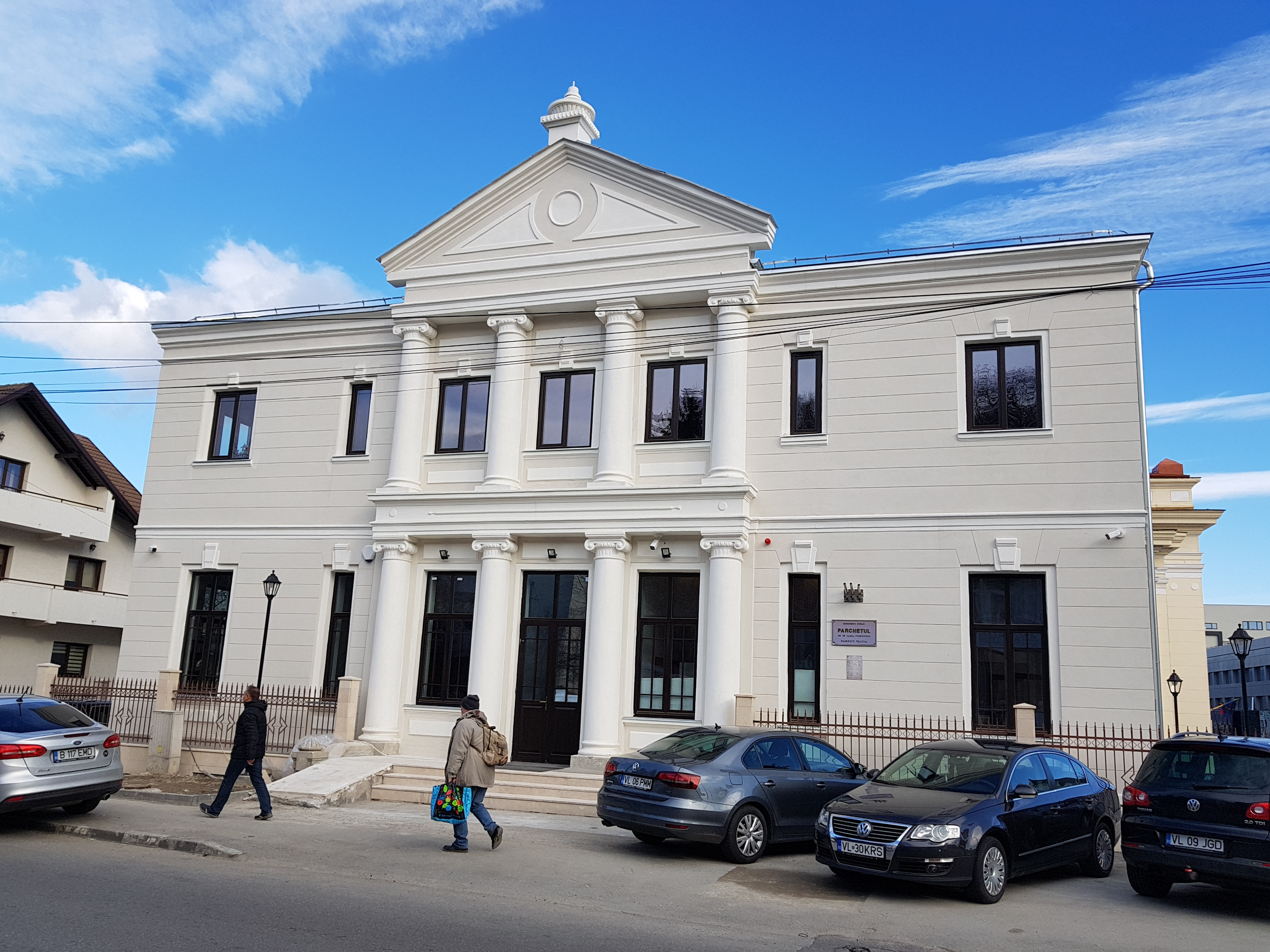
The Prosecutor's Office in Râmnicu Vâlcea

The mayor of Râmnicu Vâlcea is Mircia Gutău of the Romanian Ecologist Party (PER), following the 2020 Romanian local elections. The Râmnicu Vâlcea Municipal Council, elected at the 2020 local elections, consists of 23 councillors, with the following party composition:

Party	Seats	Current Council
National Liberal Party (PNL)	9	
Social Democratic Party (PSD)	6	
Ecologist Party (PER)	5	
Save Romania Union (USR)	3	

== Sports ==
Râmnicu Vâlcea is home to SCM Râmnicu Vâlcea, which is a women's handball club that competes traditionally in the EHF Champions League. At football, the town was previously known for its now dissolved local football club Chimia Râmnicu Vâlcea which won one Romanian cup in 1973. It briefly participated in the UEFA Cup Winners' Cup/European Cup Winners' Cup during one season (namely in 1973–1974) for just one round (more specifically the first one) against Northern Irish side Glentoran F.C. which subsequently went on to the quarter-finals.

== Villages ==
The city administers thirteen villages: Aranghel, Căzănești, Copăcelu, Dealu Malului, Fețeni, Goranu, Lespezi, Poenari, Priba, Râureni, Săliștea, Stolniceni, and Troian. Goranu, Fețeni, Lespezi, and Săliștea were a separate commune, Goranu, until 1996, when they were merged into the town.

== Notable people ==
- Radu Berceanu (born 1953), engineer and politician
- Dan Burghelea (born 1943), mathematician
- Florin Cîțu (born 1972), politician who served as Prime Minister
- Bogdan-Daniel Deac (born 2001), chess grandmaster
- Doru Dudiță (born 1977), footballer
- Ioan Emanoil Florescu (1819–1893), general who served as Chief of the General Staff and Prime Minister
- Gheorghe I. Lahovary (1838–1909), engineer and writer
- Gabriel Liiceanu (born 1942), philosopher
- Nicolae Manolescu (born 1939), literary critic
- Marian-Jean Marinescu (born 1952), politician
- Maria Marinela Mazilu (born 1991), skeleton racer
- Horia Moculescu (born 1937), pianist and composer
- Mihail Oromolu (1875–1945), magistrate and politician
- Alexandru Papadopol (born 1975), actor
- Napoleon Pop (1945–2023), economist and politician
- Ilie Purcaru (1933–2008), journalist and poet
- Dem Rădulescu (1931–2000), theatre, film, and television actor, and academic
- Magdalena Rădulescu (1902–1983), painter, illustrator
- Peter Stoica (born 1949), electrical engineering professor
- Dorel Zugrăvescu (1930–2019), geophysicist

== Gallery ==
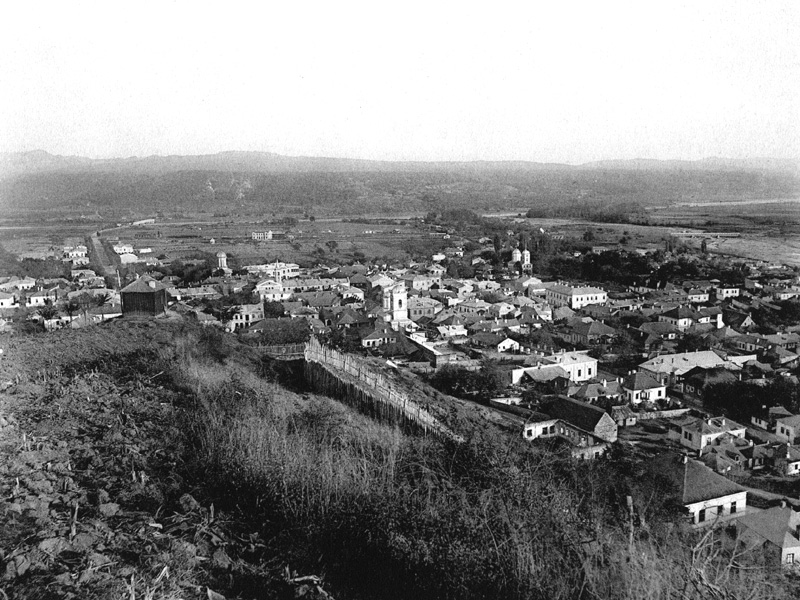
Râmnicu Vâlcea at the turn of the 20th century

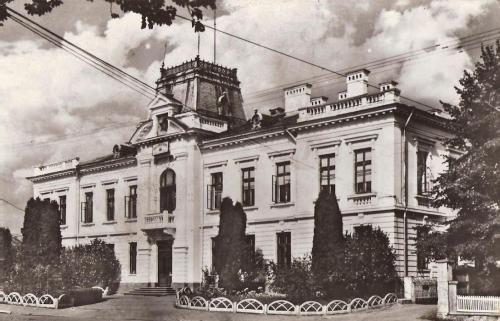
Râmnicu Vâlcea town hall at the beginning of the 20th century

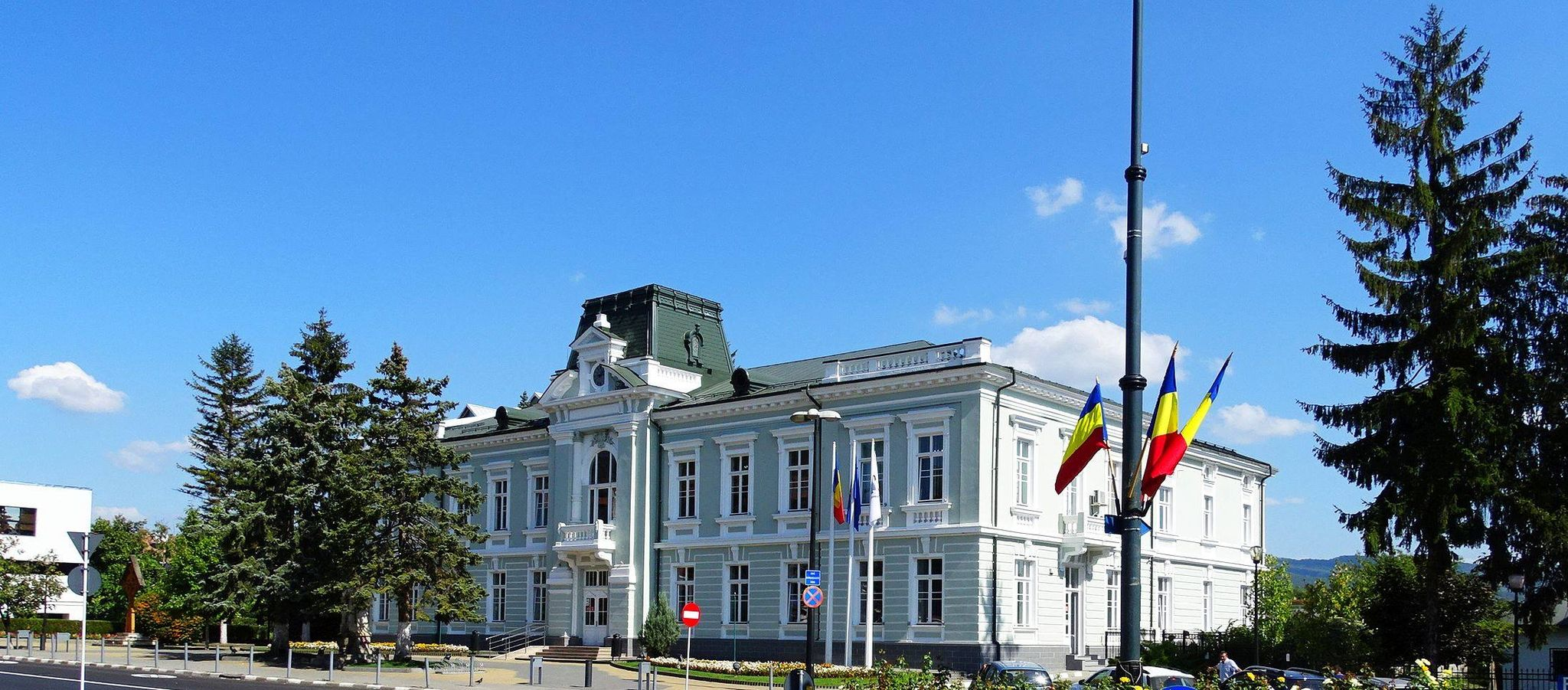
Râmnicu Vâlcea town hall in September 2020

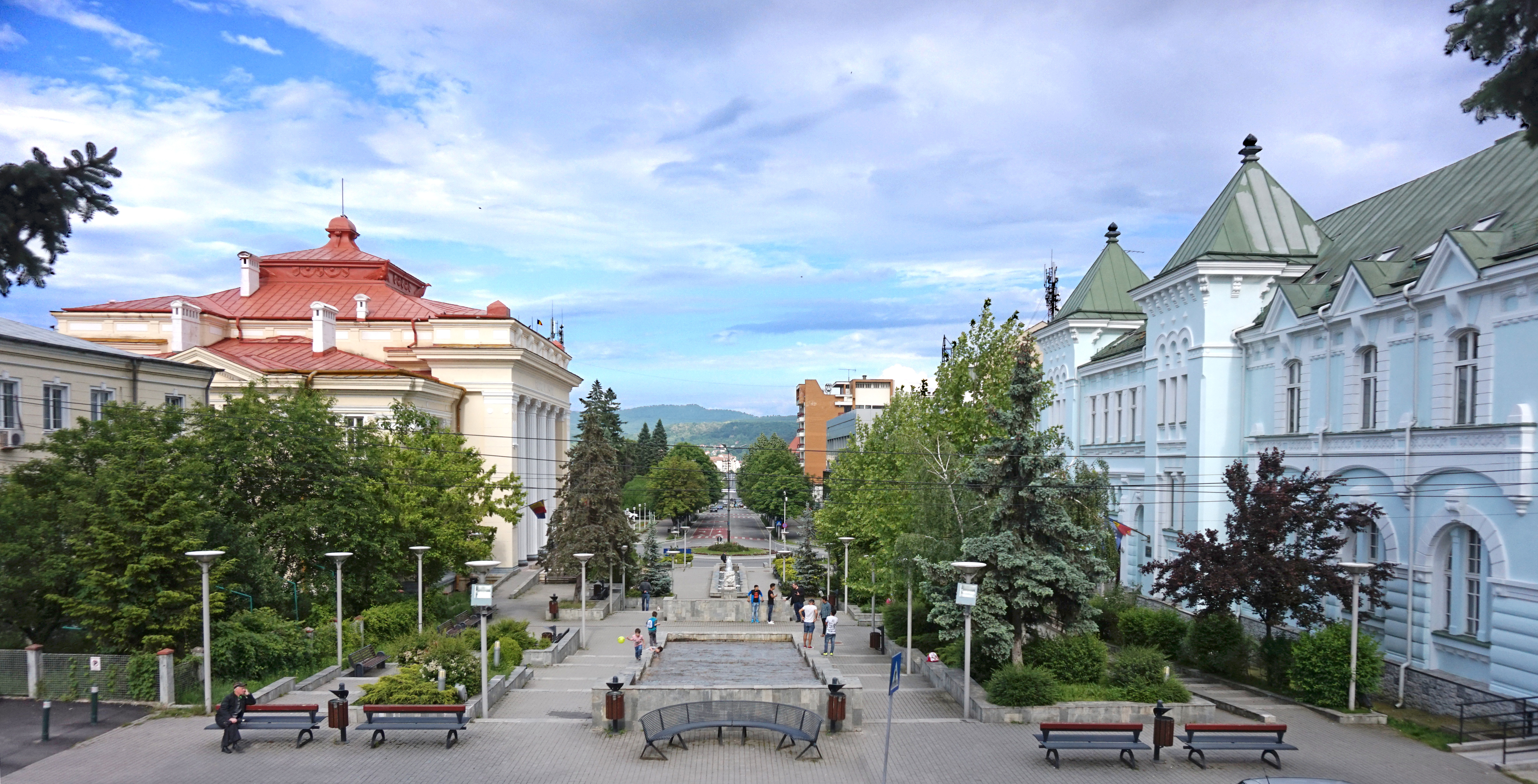
Revolution Square

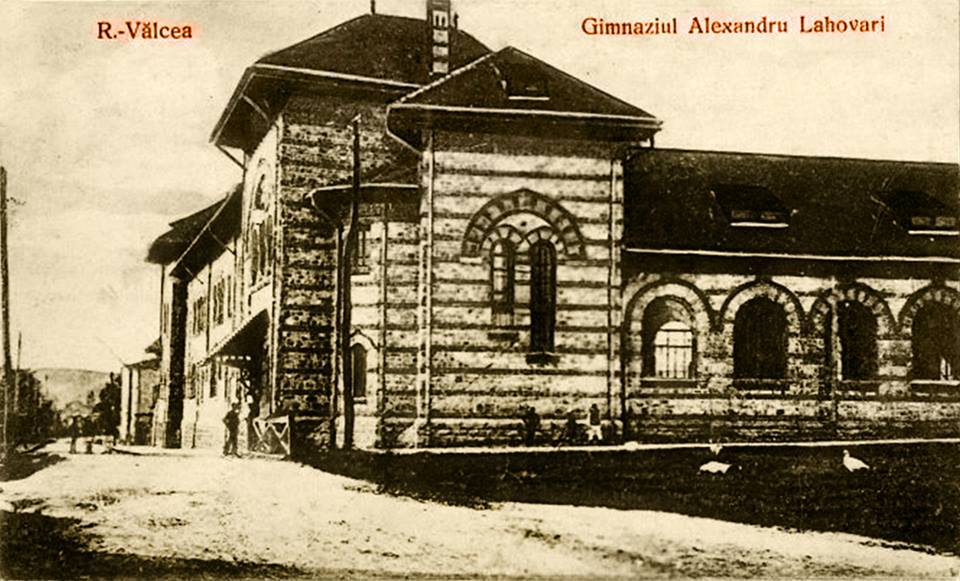
Alexandru Lahovari National College (then secondary school) at the beginning of the 20th century

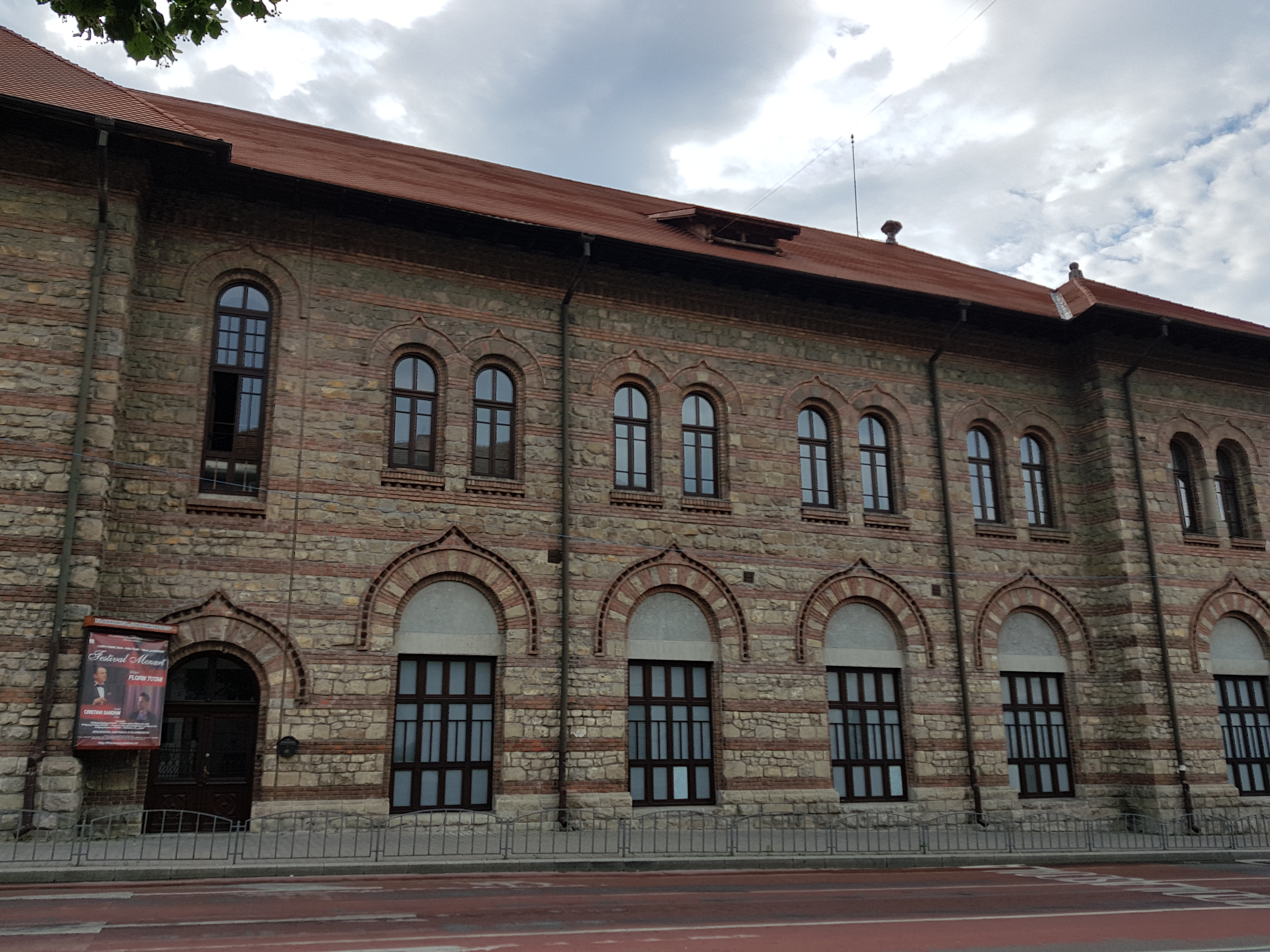
Alexandru Lahovari National College

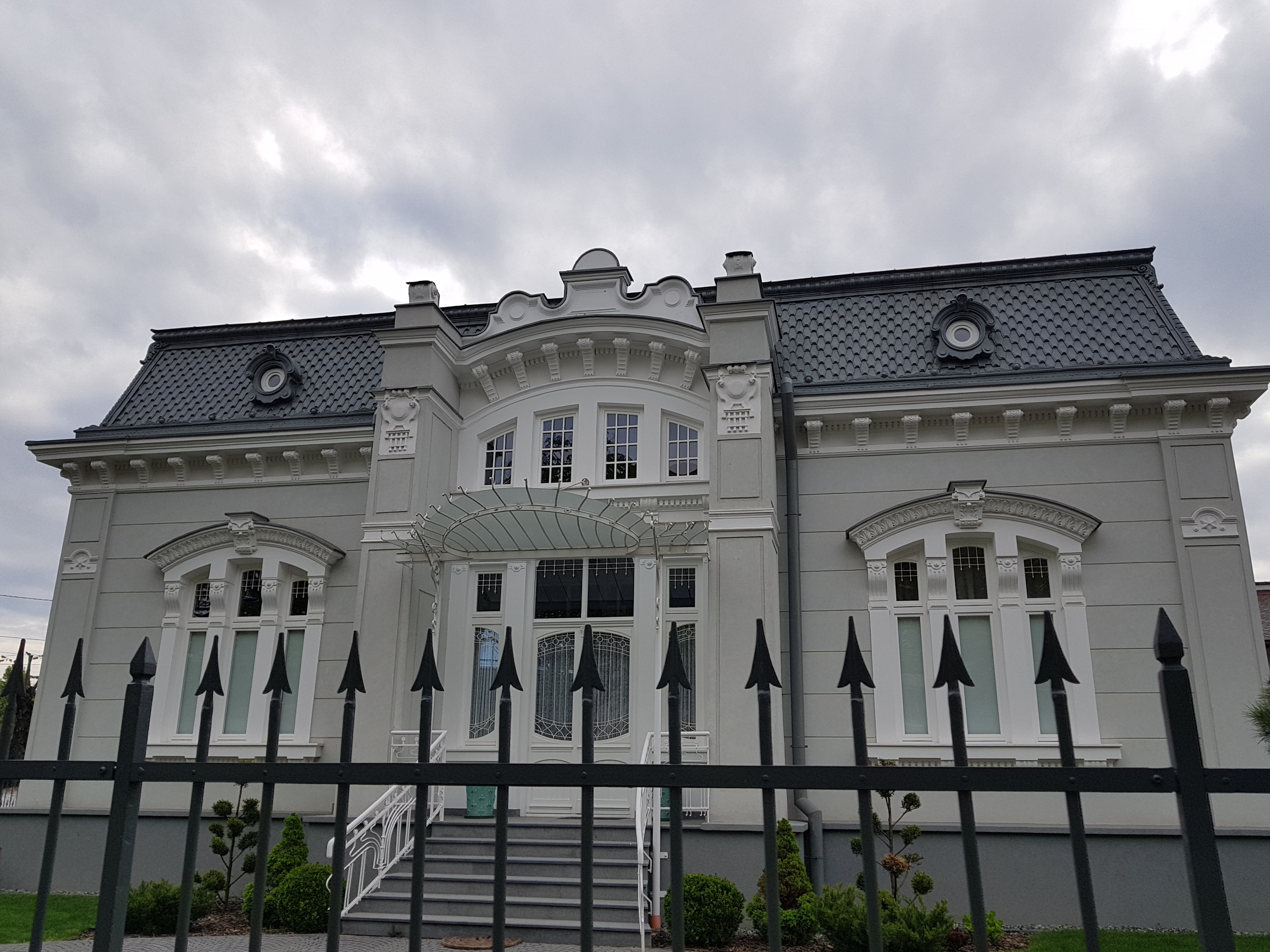
Historical house on Vasile Olănescu Street

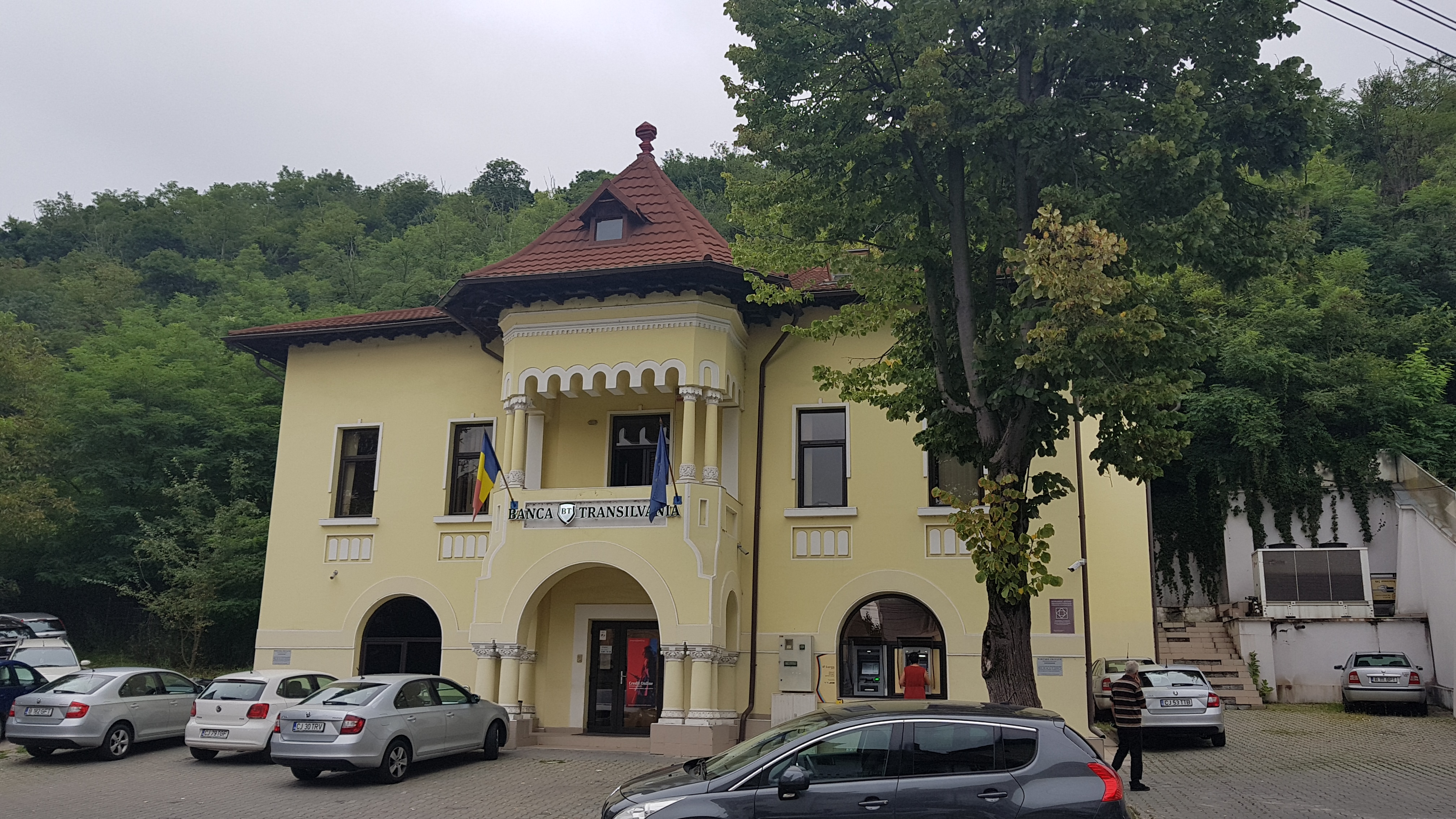
Historical house on Gabriel Stoianovici Street

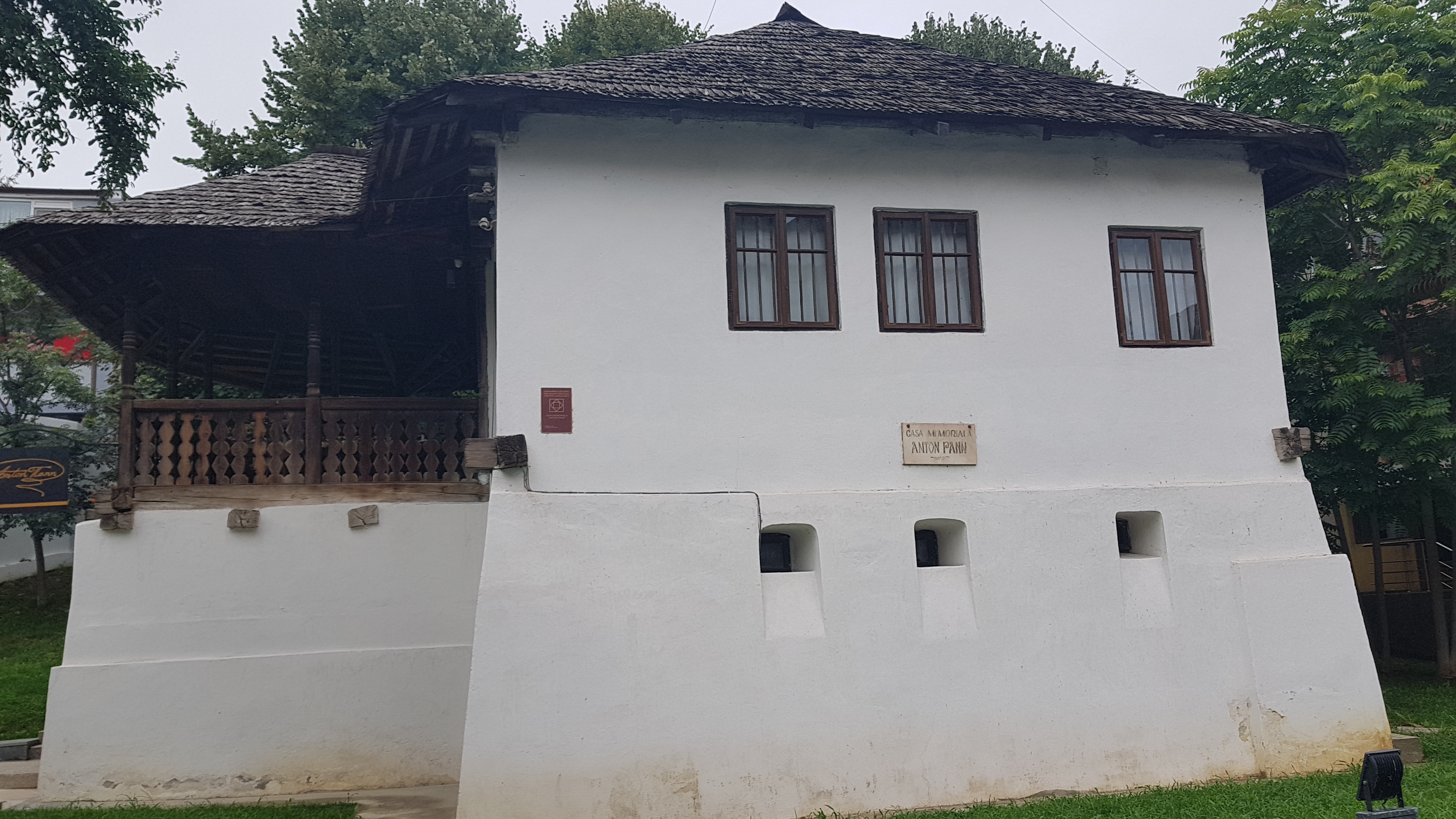
Anton Pann memorial house

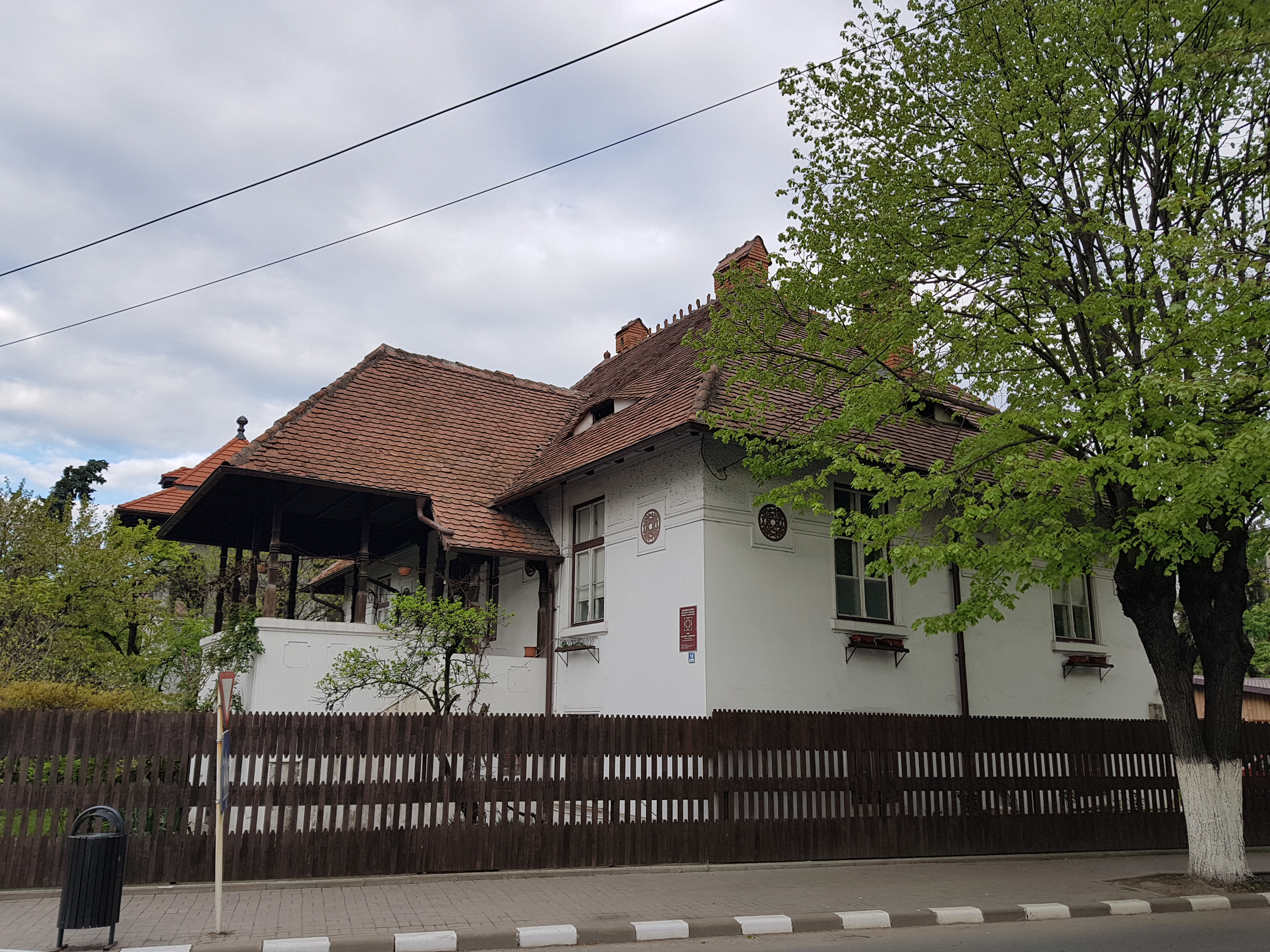
Nicolae Balotescu memorial house

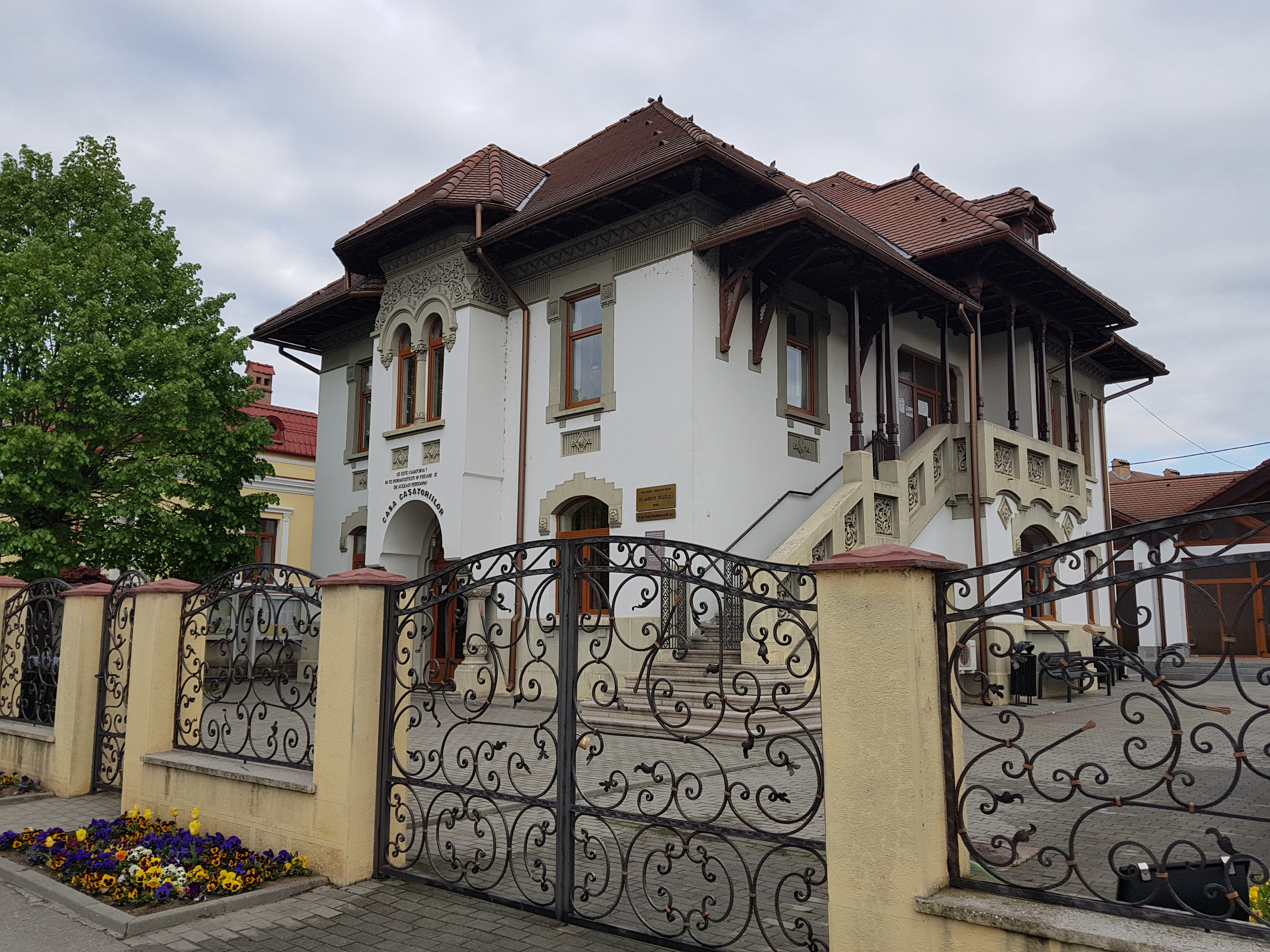
Historical house on Tudor Vladimirescu Street

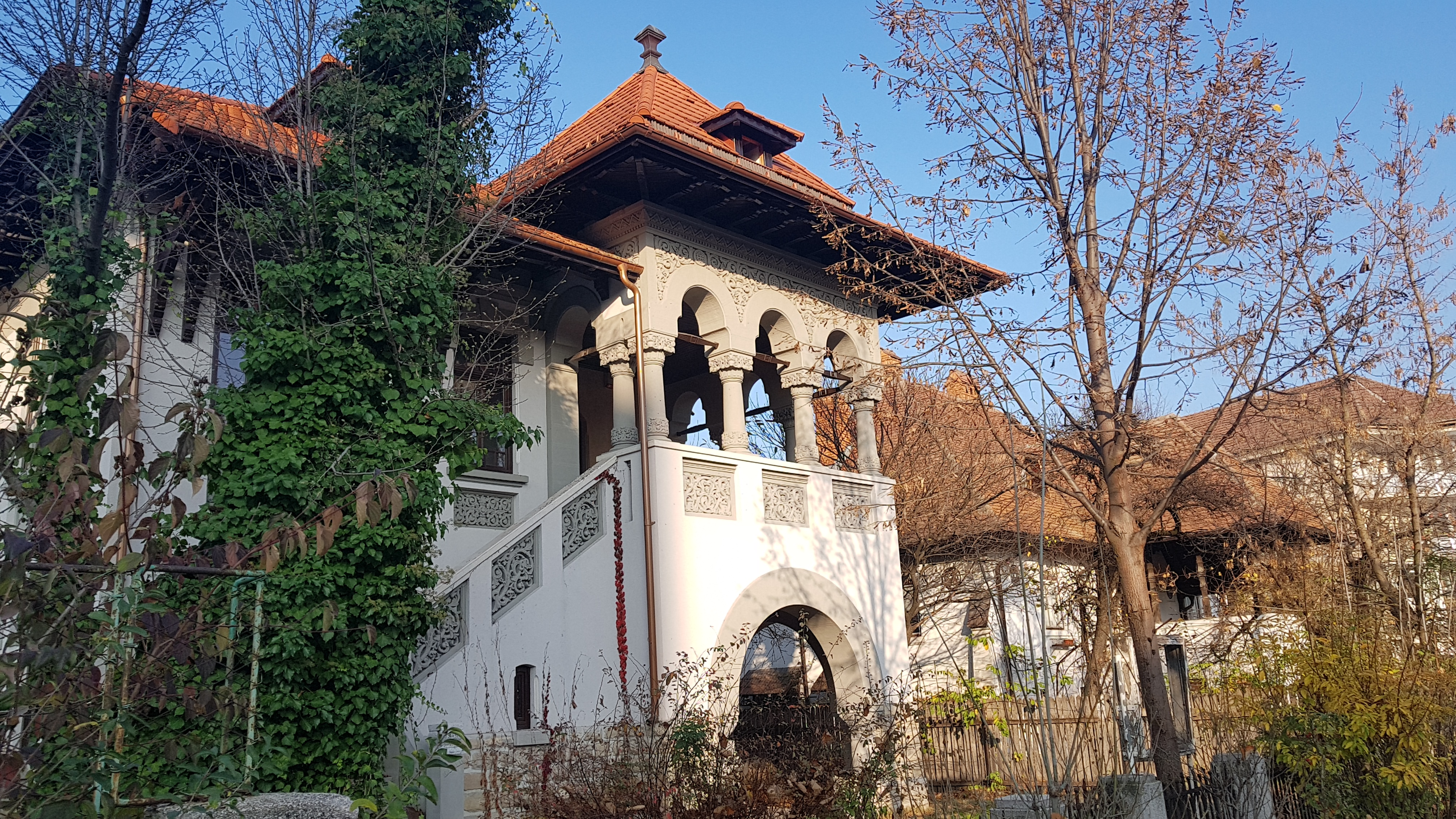
Constantin Tetoianu historical house

== See also ==
- Oltchim S.A.
- Chimia Râmnicu Vâlcea
