= Virgiliu Pop =

Romanian space lawyer and author (born 1974)

- Born: 1974 (age 51–52)
- Citizenship: Romanian
- Occupations: Researcher for the Romanian Space Agency, Space lawyer, Author
- Employer: Romanian Space Agency
- Known for: Romanian Space Lawyer, Author, ROMars Mission
- Website: http://www.virgiliupop.com/

Virgiliu Pop (born in 1974) is a Romanian space lawyer and author. He has claimed ownership of the Sun in order to make a point about extraterrestrial property rights claims that he argues are bogus. He has asserted that the Moon is a "commons", but also predicts that this status would not last if lunar exploitation were to become practical.

He works for the Romanian Space Agency and is publicly active in promoting space efforts in Romania.

In 2026, asteroid (733086) Virgiliupop was named in his honor by the International Astronomical Union.

== List of works ==
- Pop, Virgiliu (2009). Who Owns the Moon?: Extraterrestrial Aspects of Land and Mineral Resources Ownership. Space Regulations Library. Springer. ISBN 978-1-4020-9134-6.
- Pop, Virgiliu (2006). Unreal Estate – The Men who Sold the Moon. Cornwall, UK: Exposure. ISBN 1-84685-095-9.
- Avocatul Poporului – Institutie fundamentala a statului de drept: (ISBN 973-96412-8-8) a book about the ombudsman institution 1995
- Orizont Interior: (No ISBN) a poetry book 1992
