= Mircea Popescu =

Romanian electrical engineer

Mircea Popescu is an electrical engineer from Romania who, as vice president of engineering for Motor Design Ltd, Ellesmere, UK was named Fellow of the Institute of Electrical and Electronics Engineers (IEEE) in 2015 "for contributions to AC induction and permanent magnet electric machines".

Popescu received bachelor's and doctoral degrees from the Politehnica University of Bucharest, and a second doctorate from Aalto University in Finland. He worked at the National Institute for Research and Development in Electrical Engineering in Bucharest, Aalto University, and the University of Glasgow before becoming vice president and later chief technical officer of Motor Design Ltd. Motor Design Ltd was purchased by Ansys in 2022, and Popescu continued to work for Ansys as a principal product specialist.
