= Stefan Pop (comedian) =

Dutch comedian and actor

- Born: Stefan Adriaan Pop; 22 September 1985; Rotterdam, Netherlands

Comedy career
- Years active: 2005-present
- Medium: Stand-up, television, podcasting
- Genres: Cabaret, satire, sketch comedy
- Website: stefanpop.com

Stefan Adriaan Pop (born 22 September 1985) is a Dutch stand-up comedian and actor.

== Early life ==
During his university studies in 2005, he successfully auditioned for "Comedytrain", a prestigious comedy club and talent development center for Dutch stand-up comedians based in Amsterdam.

== Career ==
From 2006 to 2012, Pop was a writer for the satirical television show Dit was het nieuws. In 2009, he participated in the Edinburgh Fringe Festival as part of the "Amsterdam Underground Comedy Collective". He has performed several solo shows, including Popaganda (2010), Mijn blauwe periode (2012) and Het moest een keer gebeuren (2024). In 2017, Stefan Pop was a co-creator of Klikbeet, a satirical sketch program for television.

In March 2025, Pop created and starred in a sketch for Klikbeet, parodying the heated exchange between U.S. President Donald Trump, Vice President JD Vance, and Ukrainian President Volodymyr Zelenskyy during a White House meeting. The sketch portrays Ukraine as a wounded patient, with caregivers (representing the U.S.) suggesting he should be more grateful for the assistance provided. This video resonated globally, going viral on platforms like X and Reddit, with millions of views.
