= Napoleon Pop =

Romanian politician (1945–2023)

Member of the Chamber of Deputies of Romania
- In office 28 December 2000 – 11 October 2004
- Succeeded by: Mircea Ciopraga

Personal details
- Born: 3 February 1945 Râmnicu Vâlcea, Romania
- Died: 4 September 2023 (aged 78)
- Party: PNL
- Education: Bucharest Academy of Economic Studies
- Occupation: Economist

Napoleon Pop (3 February 1945 – 4 September 2023) was a Romanian economist and politician. A member of the National Liberal Party, he served in the Chamber of Deputies from 2000 to 2004.

Pop died on 4 September 2023, at the age of 78.
