= Alexandru Pop (rugby union) =

Romania international rugby union player

- Born: Ioan Alexandru Pop; 29 August 1945 (age 81) Bucharest, Romania

Rugby union career
- Position: Flanker/Number 8
Youth career
- 1965–1968: University of Petrosani
Senior career
Years	Team	Apps	(Points)
1969–1979	CFR Grivita Rosie Bucharest	246	(48)
International career
Years	Team	Apps	(Points)
1970–1975	Romania	19	
Coaching career
- Years: Team
- 1979–1981: CFR Grivita Rosie Under-19
- 1979–1981: Romania Under-19
- 1983–1984: Santa Monica Rugby Club

Ioan Alexandru Pop (born 29 August 1945 in Bucharest) is a former Romanian rugby union player. Played flanker and number eight. He was captain of the Romanian Rugby team in 1974 and 1975, a period when Romania's National Rugby Team gained respect in both hemispheres of the rugby world. Alexandru led a highly motivated and talented Romanian Rugby Team to wins against France 15–10 in Bucharest, the FIRA – Association of European Rugby championship, and obtained a 10–10 draw against the New Zealand Junior All Blacks in Wellington.

Alexandru Pop played rugby from 1963 to 1979. Between 1970 and 1975, he played for Romania 36 times, 19 of which were Test Matches. In 1976, Alexandru retired from playing international rugby. He took the time to focus on his engineering career, play rugby for his own club, and coach the under-19 teams for both his club and his country.

While the August-1975 draw against the Junior All Blacks in Wellington was a surprise to the rugby world, the New Zealand experts surmised that, "The Romanians would probably have won had they trusted their running rather than their kicking.

In 1975 Alexandru Pop was awarded the Honored Master of Sport Romanian: Maestru Emerit al Sportului title by the Romanian Rugby Federation.

Sponsored by former United States Eagles and Philadelphia Whitemarsh Rugby Football Club coach George Betzler, Alexandru immigrated with his family to United States in December 1982. Since 1983, he and his family have lived in Southern California.

Alexandru Pop's rugby career was covered in several Romanian rugby books such as The 15 in the Carpathians and Rugby – Small Encyclopedia. Pop and his son Max visited the Romanian Rugby delegation to the 2011 Rugby World Cup, in New Zealand.

== See also ==
- List of Romania national rugby union players

Sporting positions
Preceded by Adrian Mateescu	Romania Captain; 1974–1975	Succeeded by Mircea Paraschiv
