= Cristian Popescu (poet) =

Romanian poet

Cristian Popescu (Romanian pronunciation: [kristiˈan poˈpesku]; 1 June 1959 – 21 February 1995) was one of the most important Romanian poets of the 1990s.

Born in Bucharest, he completed his studies at the Faculty of Letters of the University of Bucharest. He died in 1995, at age 35, and was buried at Ghencea Military Cemetery.
