= Ștefan Pop =

Romanian singer and opera singer (born 1987)

Ștefan Pop (born 16 February 1987) is a Romanian operatic tenor. He is considered among today's leading lyric tenors and he is best known for bel canto repertoire. He has won several prizes including, in 2010, Plácido Domingo's Operalia competition and the Seoul International Music Competition.

== Early life and education ==
Pop was born in Bistrița. He started studying violin when he was seven, and he sang in his elementary school choir. He trained at the Gheorghe Dima Music Academy in Cluj-Napoca, graduating in 2010.

== Career ==
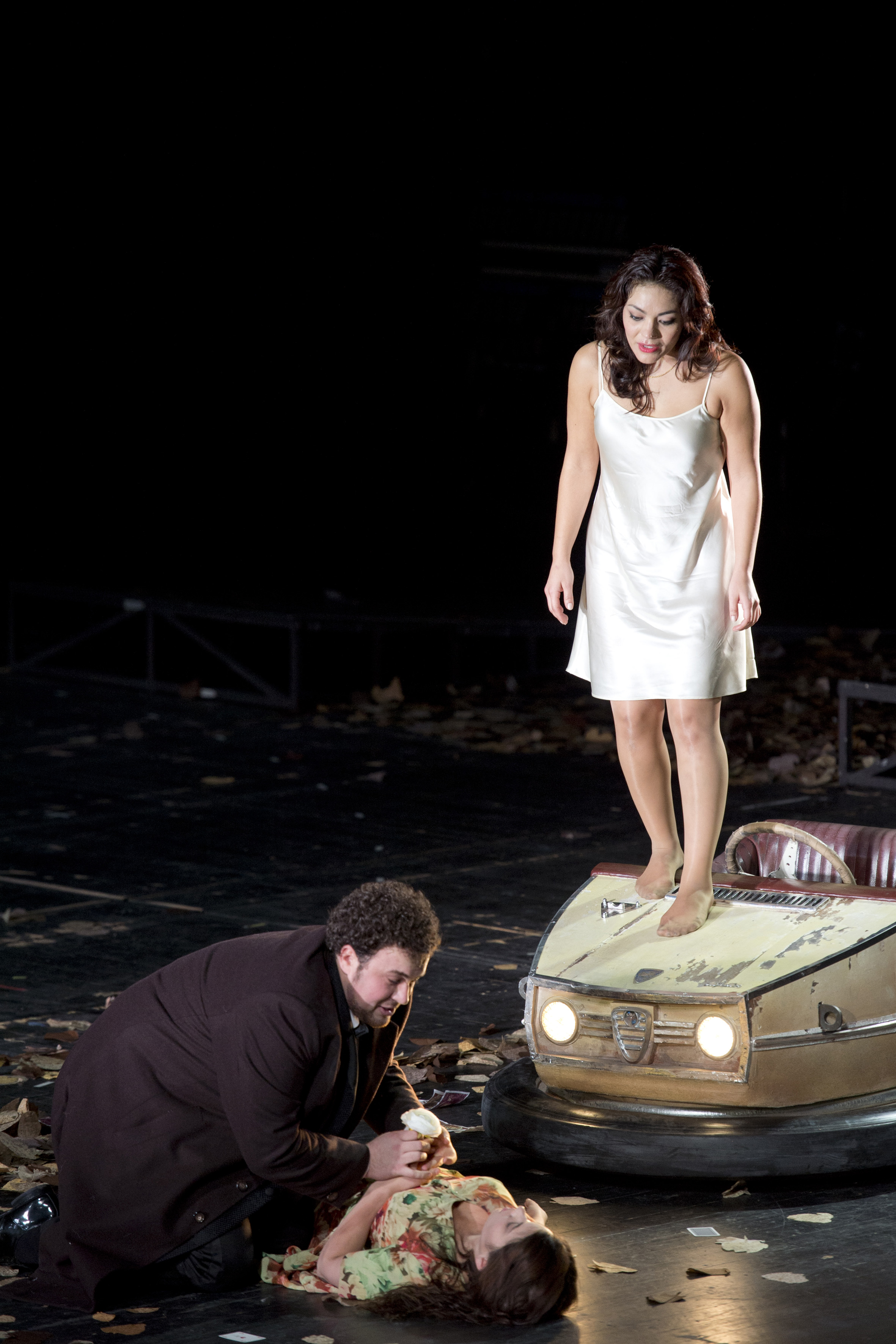
Production of La traviata at Hamburg State Opera 2013; Pop as Alfredo Germont, Ailyn Pérez as Violetta Valéry

He began his professional career in 2009 at Hungarian Opera Cluj as Paolino in Il matrimonio segreto and as Nemorino in L'elisir d'amore at the Romanian National Opera, Timișoara. Pop made his international operatic debut in Teatro dell'opera di Roma in December 2009 as Alfredo in La traviata, under the baton of Gianluigi Gelmetti, in a production of Franco Zeffirelli.

In 2010, at the age of 23, he won First Male and the Public Prize at Plácido Domingo's Operalia at the Teatro alla Scala, and also won first prize at International Music Competition in Seoul.

After winning Operalia, Pop made his debut at Vienna State Opera as Alfredo in La traviata, and also sang it at Greek National Opera, Romanian National Opera, Timișoara, Hamburg State Opera alongside Edita Gruberová, under the baton of Simone Young; also at Teatro Verdi di Trieste (2010) as Nemorino in L'elisir d'amore and at Hamburg State Opera (2011) and sung his first Elvino in La sonnambula at Vienna State Opera under Evelino Pido's baton in the same year. Later that year he also made his debut at Zurich Opera as Cassio in Verdi's Otello under Daniele Gatti's baton and in Seoul as Il Duca di Mantova in Rigoletto. In 2011, he did La traviata in Teatro Carlo Felice, Teatro Massimo alongside Mariella Devia, Israeli Opera and Oper Frankfurt.

In February 2012 Pop made his first appearance on the stage of Opéra Bastille as Il Duca di Mantova in Rigoletto. In December 2012 he made his debut at the Royal Opera House in London, performing Nemorino in L'elisir d'amore, and also in Lausanne Opera. In the same year he was invited by Plácido Domingo to perform at his Operalia winners Gala at the Royal Opera House in London.

In 2011 and 2012, Pop was guest in four of Angela Gheorghiu's concerts in the Far East (Seoul and Shanghai) and Middle East (Oman) very well received by the audience. Pop made his debut in Stabat Mater by Gioachino Rossini and Te Deum of Georges Bizet at XVII Festival de Musique Sacree de Marseille. At Soirées Lyriques de Sanxay he made in 2012 La traviata and in 2016 Rigoletto.

2013 brought the debut at the Bolshoi Theatre in Moscow as Alfredo in La traviata and also the debut in the title role of Faust at the National Opera in Bucharest. At Hamburg State Opera he made a new production of La traviata. It was a very successful performance soon followed by other Faust performances at Opera Rijeka (Croatia, March 2014) and Hong Kong Cultural Center (May 2014). Also in 2013, Pop was invited by Plácido Domingo to perform together in the Verdi–Wagner Gala at the Arena di Verona conducted by Daniel Oren.

In June 2014 he made his debut as Rodolfo in the concert version of La bohème at Salle Pleyel in Paris, alongside Patrizia Ciofi. Later on, in August 2014, he also made a debut, as the Italian singer in Der Rosenkavalier at the Salzburg Festival, a performance that is now available on DVD. Also in 2014 he sung in La traviata at Opera Menorca together with Leo Nucci and Norah Amselem, L'elisir d'amore at Monte Carlo Opera and a new production of La sonnambula at Frankfurt Oper under the baton of Eun Sun Kim.

In February 2015, Pop made the debut in Don Giovanni at Opéra Bastille, Paris, alongside a great cast under Alain Altinoglu's baton. He took part in two major music festivals, the Menuhin Festival Gstaad, Switzerland, as Don Ottavio in Don Giovanni, together with Erwin Schrott; and the George Enescu Festival in Bucharest, Romania, in an open air concert conducted by David Crescenzi. In November 2015, he did La traviata at Teatro di San Carlo, under the baton of Nello Santi. In the same year he made L'elisir d'amore at Israeli Opera.

In November 2015 he was offered the title of honorary citizen of his home town, Bistrița.

In 2016 he sang three major roles, Pollione in Norma, with Mariella Devia and Nello Santi at Teatro di San Carlo; Roberto Devereux in Roberto Devereux with Mariella Devia and Sonia Ganassi at Teatro Carlo Felice; Foresto in Attila (opera) under the baton of Riccardo Frizza at La Fenice. He made his debut at Teatro Real with Mariella Devia in Norma, conductor Roberto Abbado and director Davide Livermore. In 2016 he also sang in Rigoletto at Opera Sanxay; La traviata at La Fenice and at Taormina Teatro Antico. In October 2016 he sang in Faust at Opera de Oviedo.

In February 2017 he made his debut at Teatro Regio (Parma) in La bohème, where he returned in January 2018 for Rigoletto with Leo Nucci and in March 2018 in Roberto Devereux with Mariella Devia. He also made in 2017 his Edgardo debut at Teatro Comunale di Bologna in Lucia di Lammermoor under the baton of Michele Mariotti. The role of Pollione brought him alongside Mariella Devia in Japan to Biwako Hall Center for Performing Arts, Shiga, for Norma. In the same year he made Rigoletto at Teatro di San Carlo with Nello Santi and La traviata in Seoul.

In 2018 in Italy they called him Mariella's tenor because he had the responsibility to sing the last productions she made on stage: Norma at Teatro Carlo Felice (DVD), Roberto Devereux at Teatro Regio (Parma), Norma at La Fenice ("Adio alle scene di Mariella Devia"). He made his debut as Gabriele Adorno in Simon Boccanegra (Teatro Comunale di Bologna), in Rigoletto ( Teatro Massimo, Teatro Coccia Novara), in La traviata (La Fenice), in La bohème conducted by Daniel Oren (Teatro Massimo), in La bohème (Opera Nationala Timișoara, Opera Nationala Bucuresti, Singapore, Taiwan), in L'elisir d'amore (Opera Nationala Romana Cluj-Napoca). Pop also made two concerts in 2018, one in Tallinn, Estonia, and the other one in Lviv, Ukraine. The most important production of 2018 was the realization of Il castello di Kenilworth DVD at Donizetti Opera Festival.

2019 was an important year in his career, he opened the Festival Verdi 2019 at Teatro Regio Parma with I due foscari (DVD) and also he made his debut at Festival Puccini 2019 in La bohème alongside Angela Gheorghiu, and Madama Butterfly. For the first time at Teatro Regio di Torino, Pop did a new production of Rigoletto by director John Turturro under the baton of Renato Palumbo, alongside Carlos Alvarez. Pop did the role of Duke in Rigoletto in Teatro Comunale di Bologna and Opera Nationala Romana Cluj Napoca. He returned to Teatro Carlo Felice for two Puccini operas, Madama Butterfly and La bohème. At Opera Nationala Bucuresti he sang La bohème and La traviata. In October–November, Pop made: Stefan Pop & Friends Opera Gala Concert Japan Tour in Tokyo, Osaka, Yokohama, Musashino. In December La bohème brought him back to the Vienna State Opera.

In September 2019 he received Special prize Oscar della Lirica: Golden Opera for Young Generation at Teatro La Fenice.

2020 started for Pop with two debuts, Lucrezia Borgia at Teatro Lirico Giuseppe Verdi followed by Nabucco at Teatro Regio (Turin) alongside Leo Nucci and conducted by Donato Renzetti. Pop sang alongside Angela Gheorghiu at Opéra Royal de Wallonie in last production of La bohème directed by Stefano Mazzonis di Pralafera, a coproduction made by Mezzo TV. In the same year he sang La bohème at Opera Nationala Cluj Napoca, a concert with Opera Maghiara de stat din Cluj and a concert in Győr "Voices of 2020" star singers on stage.

In 2021 he made his first opera-movie La traviata for Classica HD at Teatro Massimo Bellini conducted by Maria Fabrizio Carminati and directed by Paolo Gavazzeni and Piero Maranghi. In May 2021 he sang Faust alongside George Petean at Opera Nationala Romana Cluj, in July he made his debut at Teatro Comunale Modena in Rigoletto, in September he sang in Verdi's Requiem at Slovak Philharmonic, in November in Lucrezia Borgia at Müpa Budapest. Pop sang Duca di Mantova in Rigoletto alongside Leo Nucci in role of Rigoletto and as stage director and conducted by Plácido Domingo in Bellini Fest at Taormina Arte, where he also sang the concert "Mira, o Norma" with Marina Rebeka followed by Norma conducted by Maria Fabrizio Carminati a coproduction of Rai5. Pop sang alongside Saioa Hernández in Madama Butterfly at Berlin State Opera and in December alongside Angela Gheorghiu sang La bohème at Teatro Massimo conducted by Maria Fabrizio Carminati. He returned at Opera Nationala Timisoara and Opera Nationala Romana Bucuresti with La bohème. In November he made a Japan tour L'elisir d'amore.

In 2022 Pop sang three time at Royal Opera House, he made his debut in Tosca alongside Angela Gheorghiu than he sang Attila in concert alongside Maria Jose Siri and Ildar Abrazakov conducted by Speranza Scappuci and in November La bohème. He returns at Teatro Regio Parma in Norma and Messa da Requiem at Festival Verdi. In April 2022 he sang Tosca in concert at Haus des Rundfunks where he registed his first Tosca CD with Pentatone alongside Melody Moore, Lester Lynch and conducted by Carlo Montanaro. At Teatro Comunale di Bologna he sang Lucrezia Borgia by G. Donizetti alongside Olga Peretyatko directed by Silvia Paoli and conducted by Yves Abel. In May 2022 he made his debut at Semperoper Dresden with Madama Butterfly conducted by Gaetano Espinosa. Pop also sang in Rigoletto at Opera Nationala Iasi, in Tosca at Opera Nationala Romana Cluj Napoca, he made his debut as Riccardo in Un ballo in maschera at Opera Nationala Romana Iasi and La bohème at Opera Nationala Bucuresti. At Teatro Massimo Bellini he had a "Gran Gala Lirico" concert, then two more concerts in Japan and one in Oper Frankfurt. Last production of 2022 was La bohème at Berlin State Opera conducted by Massimo Zanetti and directed by Lindy Hume alongside Ailyn Perez.

In 2023 Pop sang four times at the Berlin State Opera, in January–February Madama Butterfly, in June–July Don Carlo alongside Aleksandra Kurzak, Rene Pape and George Petean, conducted by Daniele Rustioni, one of the performances was streamed: Staatoper fur alle. In September also Don Carlo and in December La bohème alongside George Petean. He returned at Teatro dell'Opera di Roma for Messa da Requem by G. Verdi conducted by Michele Mariotti. At Teatro Comunale di Bologna and Opera Carlo Felice Genova he sang Pollione in Norma directed by Stefania Bonfadelli and conducted by Piergiorgio Morandi (Bologna) and Riccardo Minassi (Genova). At Hamburg State Opera he returned in the role of Mario Cavaradossi in Tosca, in the role of F. B. Pinkerton in Madama Butterfly at Oper Frankfurt, in the role Duca di Mantova in Rigoletto at Opera Nationala Bucuresti. In November he returned to the Royal Opera House for Rigoletto alongside Pretty Yende and Amartuvshin Enkhbat conducted by Julia Jones and directed by Danielle Urbas in regia Oliver Mears. Stefan made his debut in Macbeth at Bayerische Staatoper alongside Amartuvshin Enkhbat, Saioa Hernandez and conducted by Andrea Battistoni.

Pop in 2024 sang in January and December La bohème alongside Angela Gheorghiu, Zoltan Nagy at Royal Opera House, then in March at Trondheim Symphony Orchestra, in April at the Spring festival Tokyo conducted by conductor Pier Giorgio Morandi, in July at Soirees Lyriques de Sanxay, and in December in Bucharest National Opera. He sang in Madama Butterfly alongside Sonya Yoncheva conducted by Domingo Hindoyan at the Berlin State Opera and alongside Elena Buratto under the condoctor's baton Speranza Scappucci in the direction of Robert Wilson at Opera Bastille streamed by France Tv. In March he sang in Tosca at Opera Nationala Iasi and Bucharest National Opera conducted by Daniel Jinga. Pop sang a concert at Suntory Hall, a concert "Arias and Canzonettas from Italian repertoire" at Transylvania Philarmonic conducted by Pier Giorgio Morandi, a closing concert of 2023/2024 season at Transylvania Philarmonic, a concert "Gala Puccini" with the Orquesta Filarmónica de Gran Canaria, a concert " Stars of Rumenian Opera Singers" at Teatro la Fenice and a concert at Biserica Evanghelica Bistrita. He sang Messa da requiem alongside Maria Jose Siri, Varduhi Abrahamyan and Michele Pertusi at Dresden Philharmonic and at Opera Sofia alongside Maria Angela Sicilia, Dmitry Ulyanov and Ekaterina Semenchuk both conducted by Daniel Oren. Pop sang the title role in Don Carlo at Semperoper Dresden alongside Elena Guseva. Pop opened the seanon in the role of Gabriele Adorno in Simon Boccanegra at Teatro dell'Opera di Roma alongside Luca Salsi, Elena Buratto, Michele Pertusi conducted by Michele Mariotti live streamd at Rai5, Radio3 classica and RayPlay.

In 2025 Pop made his debut at Finnish National Opera in Don Carlos. In April he sang in Madama Butterfly at Bavarian State Opera alongside Elena Guseva conducted by Emmanuel Villaume and Norma at the Berlin State Opera. He returned at Royal Opera House in Faust alongside Carolina Lopez Moreno, Adam Palka and Boris Pinkhasovich conducted by Maurizio Benini. Pop sang Faust at Bucharest National Opera alongside Erwin Schrott and Anita Hartig.

== Personal life ==
Pop got married in May 2019 and has 2 daughters.

== Discography ==
DVDs

- 2014: Strauss – Der Rosenkavalier (Krassimira Stoyanova, Sophie Koch, Mojca Erdmann, Wiebke Lehmkuhl, Günther Groissböck, Adrian Eröd, Krešimir Špicer, Ștefan Pop)
- 2017: Donizetti – Roberto Devereux (Mariella Devia, Sonia Ganassi, Stefan Pop, Mansoo Kim, Alessandro Fantoni, Claudio Ottino, Matteo Armanino, Loris Purpura)
- 2018: Donizetti – Il castello di Kenilworth (Jessica Pratt, Carmela Remigio, Xabier Anduaga, Stefan Pop, Federica Vitale, Dario Russo)
- 2019: Bellini – Norma (Mariella Devia, Annalisa Stropa, Stefan Pop, Riccardo Fassi, Andrea Battistoni)
- 2019: Verdi – I due Foscari (Stoyanov Vladimir, Pop Stefan, Katzarava Maria, Prestia Giacomo)

=== CD ===
- 2023: Puccini – Tosca (Melody Moore, Ștefan Pop and Lester Lynch)
- 2024: Verdi – Verdi Arias
- 2025: Canto per te

== Repertory ==
Pop's repertoire includes the following:

- Bellini: Norma – Pollione
- Bellini: La sonnambula – Elvino
- Bizet: Te Deum
- Cimarosa: Il matrimonio segreto – Paolino
- Donizetti: L'elisir d'amore – Nemorino
- Donizetti: Lucia di Lammermoor – Sir Edgardo di Ravenswood
- Donizetti: Lucrezia Borgia – Gennaro
- Donizetti: Elisabetta al castello di Kenilworth – Warney
- Donizetti: Roberto Devereux – Roberto Devereux
- Gounod: Faust – Faust
- Mozart: Don Giovanni – Don Ottavio
- Puccini: La bohème – Rodolfo
- Puccini: Madama Butterfly – F. B. Pinkerton
- Puccini: Tosca – Mario Cavaradossi
- Rossini: Stabat Mater
- Strauss: Der Rosenkavalier – An Italian singer
- Verdi: Attila – Foresto
- Verdi: Un ballo in maschera – Riccardo
- Verdi: Don Carlo – Don Carlo
- Verdi: I due Foscari – Jacobo Foscari
- Verdi: La traviata – Alfredo
- Verdi: Macbeth – Macduff
- Verdi: Nabucco – Ismaele
- Verdi: Rigoletto – Duca di Mantova
- Verdi: Requiem
- Verdi: Simon Boccanegra – Gabriele Adorno
- Verdi: Otello – Cassio

== Awards ==
- 2010: First Male and Public prize at Operalia
- 2015: Honorary Citizen of Bistrița
- 2018: Dimitrie Popoviciu-Bayreuth Awards at Cluj Opera Ball
- 2019: Young Generation at Oscar della lirica-International Opera Awards
