= Amy Robsart (play) =

1828 play by Victor Hugo

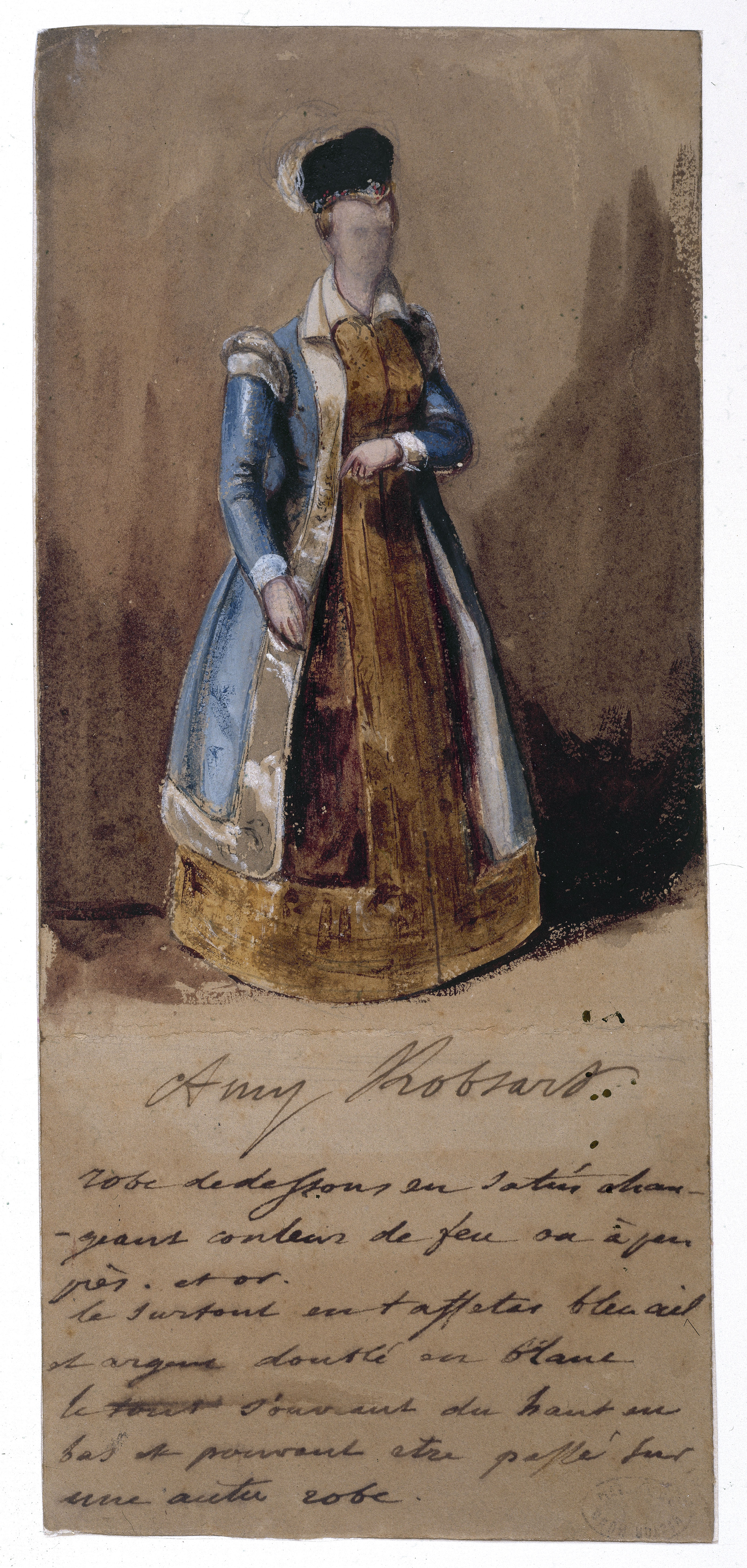
- Costume for Amy Robsart designed by Eugène Delacroix.
- Original language: French
- Written by: Victor Hugo
- Genre: Historical tragedy
- Setting: Elizabethan England

Premiere
- Date: February 1828
- Place: Théâtre de l'Odéon, Paris

Amy Robsart is an 1828 historical tragedy by the French writer Victor Hugo. It is an adaptation of the 1821 novel Kenilworth by the British author Walter Scott, whose tragic heroine is the historical figure of Amy Robsart. It takes place in Elizabethan England with many scenes set in Kenilworth Castle in Warwickshire. An earlier theatrical adaptation of the novel was written in 1821 Kenilworth while a later version Amy Robsart by Andrew Halliday premiered at the Theatre Royal, Drury Lane in 1870.

It was Hugo's first play to be staged, but its first run in Paris closed after only one night. The costumes were designed by the artist Eugène Delacroix. The libretto of the 1829 opera Il castello di Kenilworth by Gaetano Donizetti, drew from Hugo's version of the story.

== Bibliography ==
- Morse, Ruth (ed.) Hugo, Pasternak, Brecht, Césaire: Great Shakespeareans: Volume XIV. A&C Black, 2013.
- Raby, Peter. Fair Ophelia: A Life of Harriet Smithson Berlioz. Cambridge University Press, 2003.
- Thompson, Christopher W. Victor Hugo and the Graphic Arts 1820-1833. Librairie Droz, 1970.
