= Il castello di Kenilworth =

Opera by Gaetano Donizetti

- Opera by Gaetano Donizetti
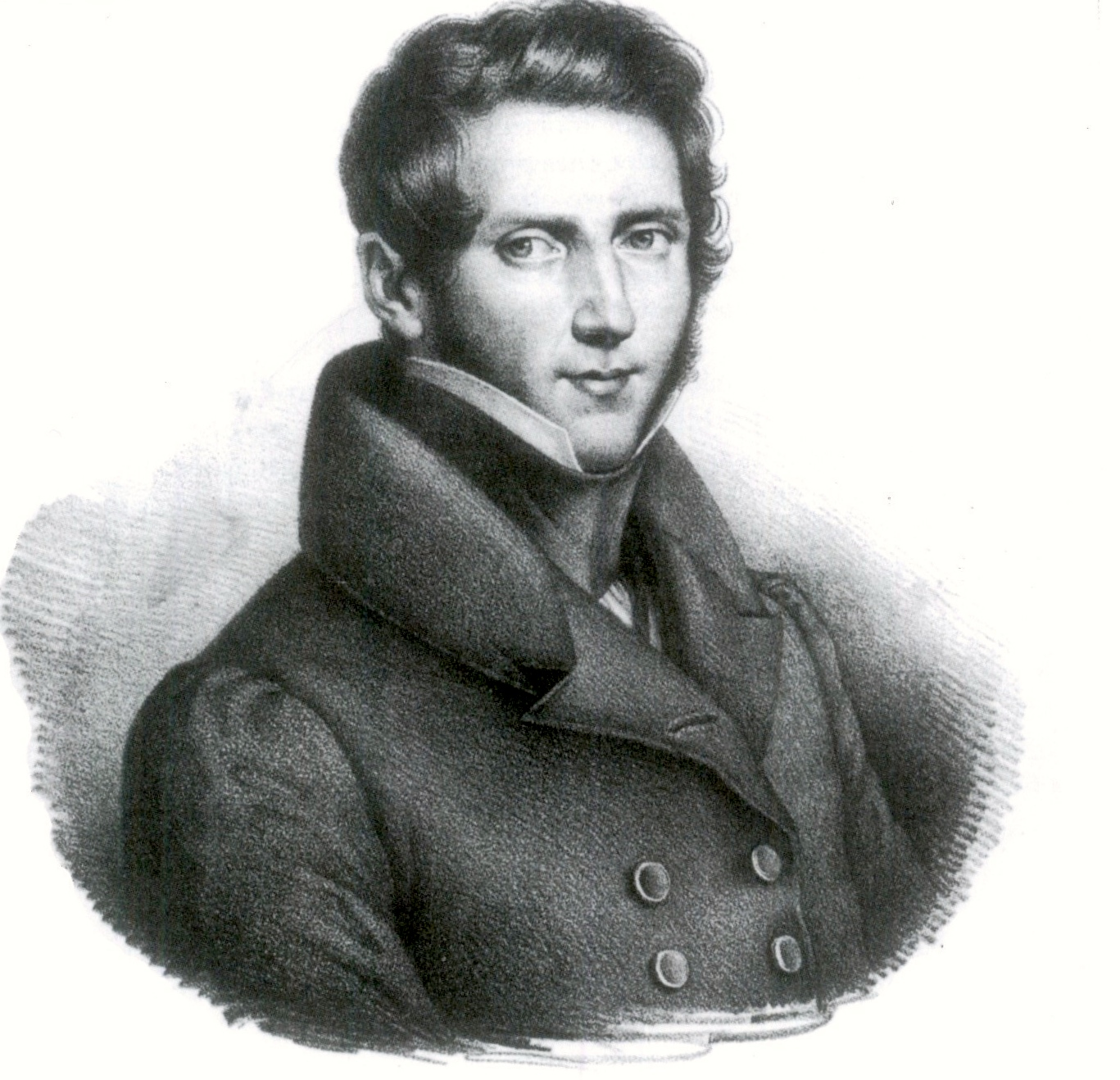
- Donizetti as a young man
- Librettist: Andrea Leone Tottola
- Language: Italian
- Based on: Amy Robsart by Victor Hugo and Leicester by Eugène Scribe
- Premiere: 6 July 1829; Teatro di San Carlo, Naples

Il castello di Kenilworth (or, under its original name in 1829, Elisabetta al castello di Kenilworth) is a melodramma serio or tragic opera in three acts by Gaetano Donizetti. Andrea Leone Tottola wrote the Italian libretto after Victor Hugo's play Amy Robsart (1828) and Eugène Scribe's play Leicester, both of which following from Sir Walter Scott's novel Kenilworth (1821). Daniel Auber composed another opera on the same subject, Leicester, ou Le chateau de Kenilworth in 1823.

This opera was the first of Donizetti's excursions into the Tudor period of English history, and it was followed in 1830 by Anna Bolena, (which was based on the life of Anne Boleyn, the second wife of King Henry VIII), then by Maria Stuarda (named for Mary, Queen of Scots) which appeared in different forms in 1834 and 1835. All represented the interests (even obsessions) of many Italian composers of the era, Donizetti's included, in the character of Elizabeth I, whose life he was to explore further in 1837 in his opera Roberto Devereux (named for Robert Devereux, 2nd Earl of Essex, a favourite of Elizabeth I). The leading female characters of the operas Anna Bolena, Maria Stuarda, and Roberto Devereux are often referred to as the "Three Donizetti Queens".

As Elisabetta al castello di Kenilworth the opera received its first performance on 6 July 1829 at the Teatro di San Carlo, Naples, and in a revised version at the same house, as Il castello di Kenilworth on 24 June 1830.

== Roles ==
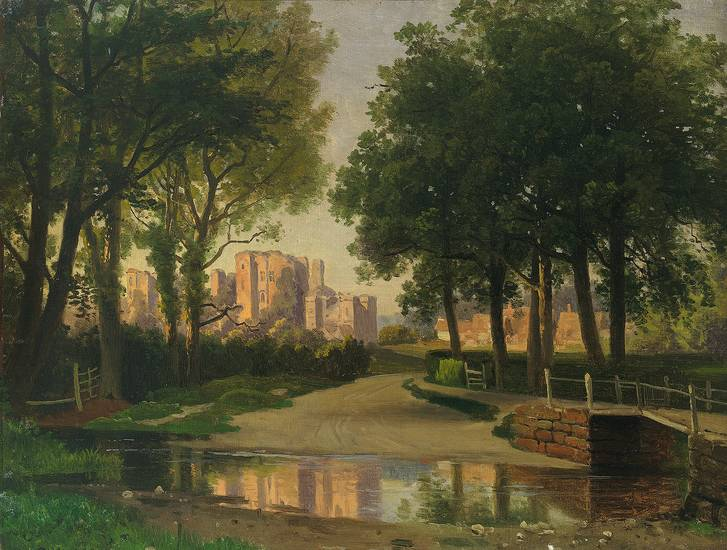
Georg Saal, Kenilworth Castle, 1866

Roles, voice types, premiere cast
Role	Voice type	Premiere cast, 6 July 1829 Conductor: Nicola Festa
Elisabetta, Queen of England	soprano	Adelaide Tosi
Roberto Dudley, Earl of Leicester	tenor	Giovanni David
Amelia Robsart, his secret consort	soprano	Luigia Boccabadati
Warney, Leicester's equerry	baritone	Berardo Calvari Winter
Lambourne, Leicester's servant	bass	Gennaro Ambrosini
Fanny, Amelia's servant	mezzo-soprano	Virginia Eden
Knights of the queen, domestic servants of Leicester, guards, soldiers, people

== Synopsis ==
Time: The reign of Queen Elizabeth I
Place: Kenilworth Castle

It is announced that Queen Elizabeth is to visit Kenilworth, the Earl of Leicester's castle. Leicester is a favourite of the Queen, but now has a new bride, Amelia Robsart, with whom he is in love. Fearing the Queen's displeasure, he asks his servant Lambourne to arrange for Amelia to be hidden until Elizabeth departs. Amelia is taken to a small cell in the castle by Leicester's equerry, Warney. He then tries to seduce her and tells that she has been placed there because her husband no longer loves her. When Amelia rejects his advances, Warney vows revenge.

Amelia manages to escape from the cell and in a secret garden of the castle encounters the Queen. She tearfully tells the Queen about her troubles with Leicester, whom she believes has betrayed her. The Queen goes to Leicester and Warney angrily demanding an explanation. Warney deceitfully tries to persuade the Queen that Amelia is his wife. The Queen vows to resolve the mystery and briefly believes the lie. Leicester, however, reveals his marriage with Amelia to the Queen who becomes even more angry and dismisses him.

Warney, still desiring revenge, attempts to take Amelia away with him from Kenilworth with a lie that it is Leicester's wish, but fails when she refuses to go. He then tries to poison Amelia, but is foiled by her faithful servant, Fanny. In the end, Elizabeth orders the arrest of Warney, pardons Leicester and Amelia, and approves their marriage to the jubilation of all.

== Recordings ==
Year	Cast: Queen Elisabeth I, Amelia Robsart, Leicester, Warney)	Conductor, Opera house and orchestra	Label
1977	Janet Price, Yvonne Kenny, Maurice Arthur, Christian du Plessis	Alun Francis, Philomusica of London and the Opera Rara Chorus (Recording of a performance in the Collegiate Theatre, London as part of the Camden Festival)	CD: MRF Records; Cat: MRF 143-S
1989	Mariella Devia, Denia Mazzola, Jozef Kundlák, Barry Anderson	Jan Latham-Koenig, Radio Televisione Italiana Orchestra and Chorus	CD: Ricordi/Fonit Cetra; Cat: RFCD 2005
2019	Jessica Pratt, Carmela Remigio, Xabier Anduaga, Ștefan Pop	Riccardo Frizza, Donizetti Opera orchestra and chorus Maria Pilar Pérez Aspa, stage director	DVD: Dynamic; Cat:57834
