= Jacques-Théodore Parisot =

French naval historian

Jacques-Théodore Parisot (20 May 1783 - November 1840) was a 19th-century French soldier and historian of the French navy, founder and head of the Historical Section of the ministry of Marine.

== Biography ==
Born in Paris on 20 May 1783, Theodore Jacques Parisot came out of the École Polytechnique in the Navy. Ensign maintained in September 1805, he served in the flottille de Boulogne. Adjutant Major of the 2nd Regiment of the fleet in 1807, he participated in 1809 in the Walcheren Campaign. Appointed a lieutenant in 1812, he distinguished himself in the defense of Helvoet-Sluys in 1813 and the following year in the Antwerp bombing.

Dismissed without pension with a year of balance in 1816 because of his attitude during the Hundred Days, he passed certification as master mariner and made journalism. Editor of the Courrier Français, he qualified himself as constitutional writer. He went in through the end of the Bourbon Restoration since, besides his appointment as head of the Historical Section, he received the Cross of the Order of Saint Louis on October 30, 1829. Parisot died in November 1840.

== Works and publications ==
- 1819: Victoires, Conquêtes, Désastres, Revers et Guerres civiles des Français, de 1792 à 1815 - maritime part by J.T. Parisot, former officer of the Imperial Navy, founder and head of the Historical Section of the ministry of Marine - Éditeur C.L.F. Panckoucke,
- 1829: De la manière d'envisager la guerre maritime de 1778 à 1783, dite guerre d'Amérique by J.T. Parisot, chef de la Section historique du Dépôt de la Marine - Travaux de la Section historique du Dépôt de la Marine -

Translations from English.

- 1819: Florence Macarty, by Sydney, Lady Morgan
- 1821: Le château de Kenilworth, by Walter Scott
- 1822: Voyage aux Etats-Unis d’Amérique, by Miss Wright
- 1823: Elemens d’économie politique, by J. Mill
- 1823: Lettres de Jussius
- 1824: Mémoires autographes de D. Augustin Iturbe, ex empereur du Mexique, by J. Quin
- 1825: Correspondance de Lord Byron
- 1825: Relation de l’expédition de Lord Byron en Grèce
- 1826: Mémoire de la margrave d’Anspach
- 1826: Mémoire sur la vie privée, politique et littéraire de R. Brinsley-L’héridan, by T. Moore
- 1826: Relation du capitaine Maitland, ex commandant du Bellérophon, concernant l’embarquement de Napoléon
