= Kenilworth (novel) =

Novel by Walter Scott

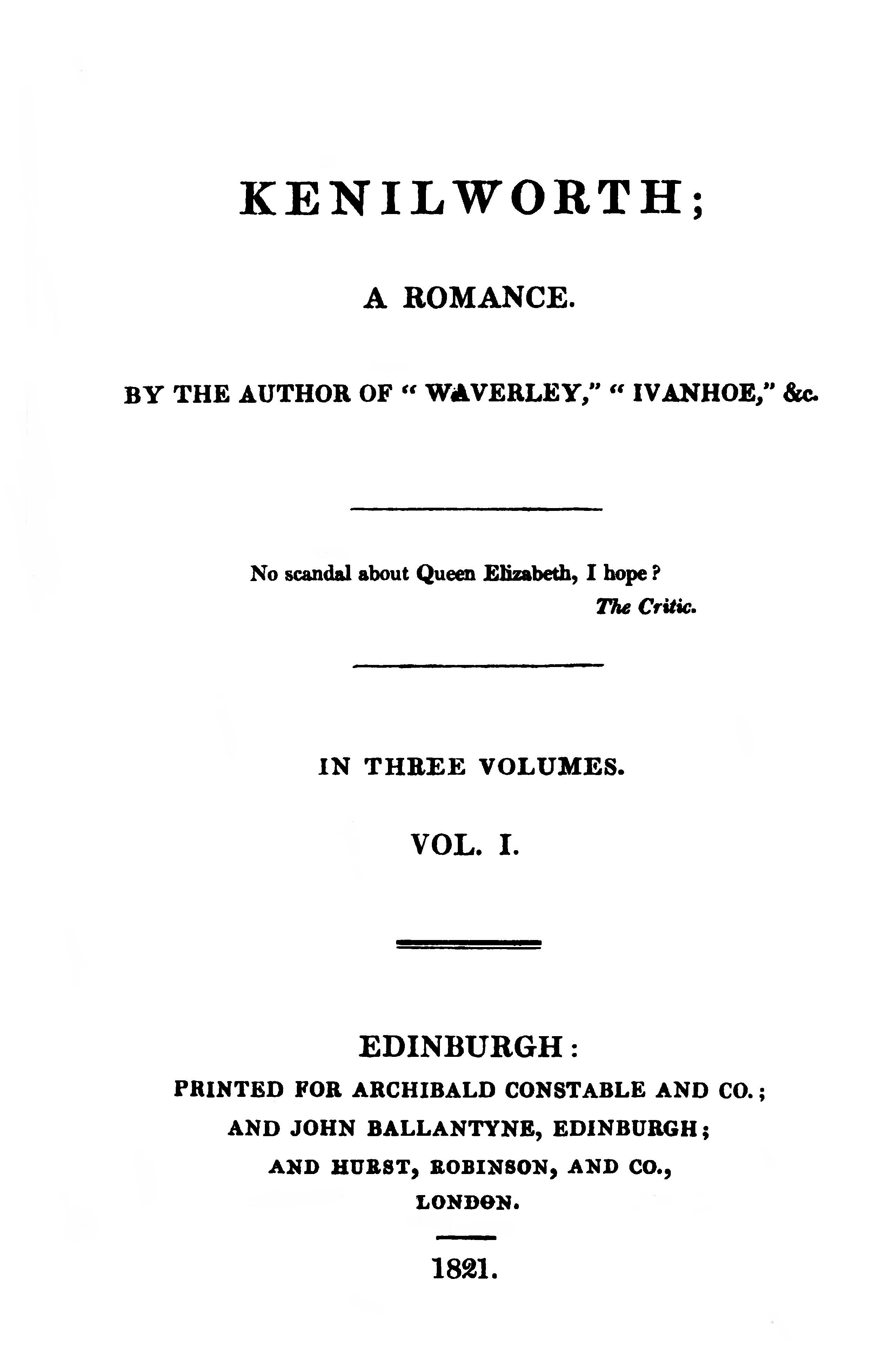
- First edition title page.
- Author: Sir Walter Scott
- Language: English
- Series: Waverley Novels
- Genre: Historical novel
- Publisher: Archibald Constable, John Ballantyne (Edinburgh); Hurst, Robinson and Co. (London)
- Publication date: 1821
- Publication place: Scotland
- Media type: Print
- Pages: 392 (Edinburgh Edition, 1993)
- Preceded by: The Abbot
- Followed by: The Fortunes of Nigel

Kenilworth. A Romance is a historical romance novel by Sir Walter Scott, one of the Waverley novels, first published on 13 January 1821. Set in 1575, it leads up to the elaborate reception of Queen Elizabeth at Kenilworth Castle by the Earl of Leicester, who is complicit in the murder of his wife Amy Robsart at Cumnor.

The novel was another huge success for Scott, who at this stage was still publishing anonymously, and was adapted for plays and several operas over the rest of the 19th century. Despite taking serious liberties with the known facts, its account has dominated understanding of the real events it recounts. Though there was certainly a great scandal over the death of Amy Robsart, but it remains unclear to historians whether her death was anything more than the accident the extensive inquest concluded it to be. There have been numerous adaptations of the novel, as plays, musicals, operas and in ballet. But these were mainly before World War One, and the novel has apparently never been filmed, except for a BBC television series that is lost.

Kenilworth is set in the reign of Queen Elizabeth I, and centres on the secret marriage of Robert Dudley and Amy Robsart, daughter of Sir Hugh Robsart. Amy passionately loves her husband, and the Earl loves her in return, but he is driven by ambition. He is courting the Queen's favour, and only by keeping his marriage to Amy secret can he hope to rise to the height of power that he desires. At the end of the book, the Queen discovers the truth, to the shame of the Earl. The disclosure has come too late, for Amy has been murdered by the Earl's even more ambitious steward, Varney. The title refers to Dudley's Kenilworth Castle in Kenilworth, Warwickshire. The novel opens at Cumnor Place, near Abingdon in Berkshire (now Oxfordshire).

Kenilworth is a novel of selfishness versus selflessness and ambition versus love. Amy and the Earl both struggle internally with selfishness and love, while Varney and Tressilian each typify the extremes of the two qualities. Perhaps the finest point of this work is its characterization. The Earl is shown as an ambition-driven man who will stoop to deceit and almost anything else in order to attain his goals, but with one saving grace—he loves Amy, and in the end gives up his pride and ambition to confess their marriage. Amy Robsart is a pretty, spoiled child whose tragic circumstances teach her maturity and determination, although such lessons come too late to save her. Tressilian is the serious, steadfast lover of Amy, and continues to try to save her from herself throughout the book and finally dies of a broken heart. Varney is the chief villain of the work. His greed and ambition know no bounds. It is he that pushes the Earl beyond what he would normally do to secure power, and it is he that finally murders Amy Robsart.

== Composition and sources ==
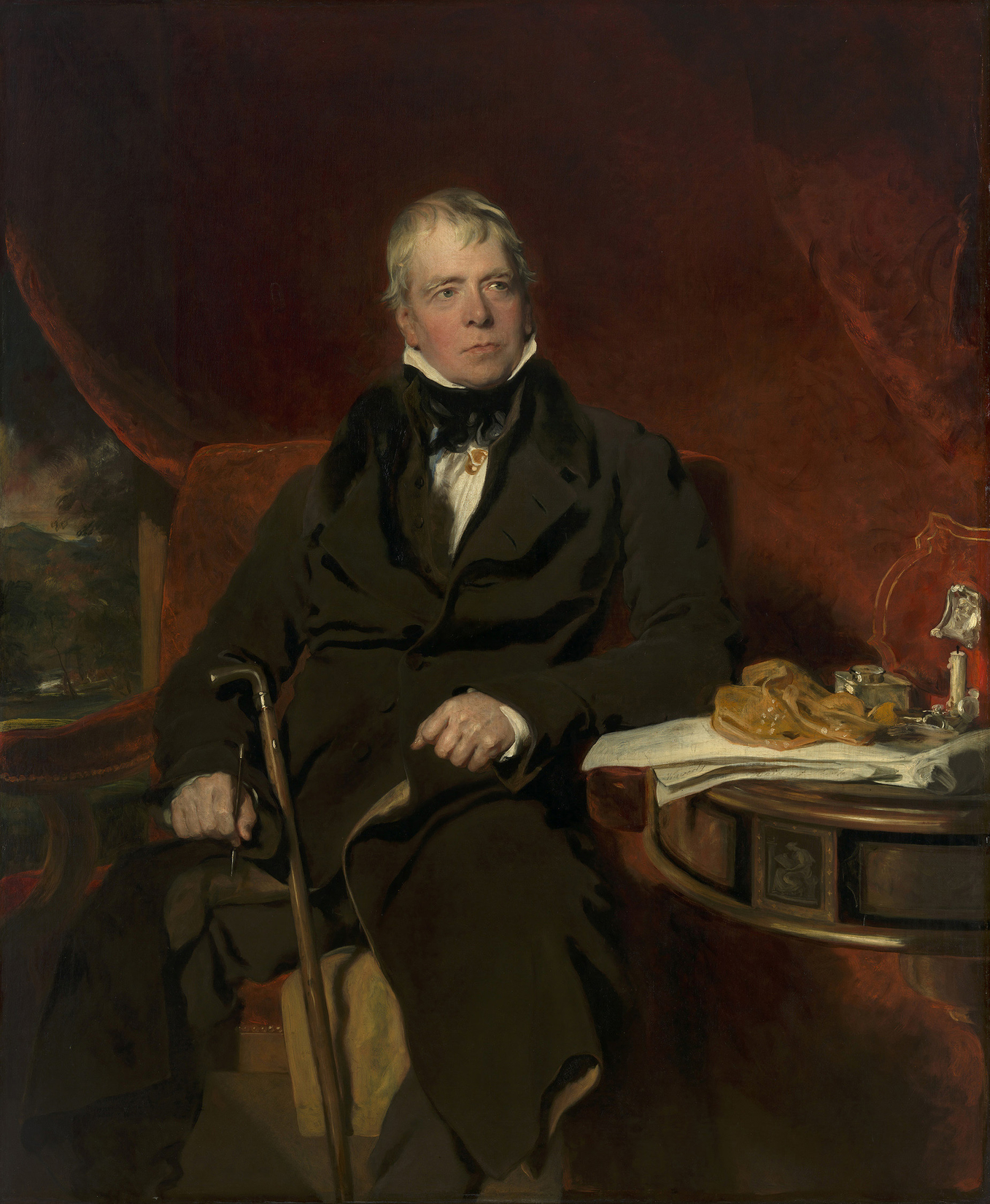
Portrait of Sir Walter Scott by Thomas Lawrence

In January 1820 Archibald Constable and John Ballantyne concluded an agreement to act as joint publishers of Kenilworth, but Scott had still to complete The Monastery and write its sequel The Abbot which kept him occupied until August, so that Kenilworth had to wait until September. Writing then progressed steadily, and the new novel was completed on 27 December.

Scott was deeply acquainted with the literature and historical documents of the Elizabethan period, partly because of his editorial labours. In 1808 he produced Memoirs of Robert Cary, Earl of Monmouth … and Fragmenta Regalia … by Sir Robert Naunton, which were to stand him in good stead for his portrayal of Queen Elizabeth in the novel, and in 1810 he revised Robert Dodsley's The Ancient British Drama which contributed much to the linguistic texture of the novel. For the public activities at Kenilworth he used two documents reprinted in The Progresses and Public Processions … of Queen Elizabeth by John Nichols (1788): A Letter by Robert Langham or Laneham and The Princely Pleasures at the Courte at Kenelwoorth by George Gascoigne. For Amy Robsart and Cumnor he relied on Antiquities of Berkshire by Elias Ashmole which in turn drew on the anonymous and hostile Secret Memoirs of Robert Dudley, Earl of Leicester or Leicester's Commonwealth.

== Editions ==
Kenilworth was published in three volumes by Constable and Ballantyne in Edinburgh on 13 January 1821, and by Hurst, Robinson, and Co. in London on the 20th. As with all the Waverley novels before 1827 publication was anonymous. The print run was 10,000, with a further 2000 in a second edition which followed two months later, and the price was one and a half guineas (£1 11s 6d or £1.57½). It is unlikely that Scott was involved with the novel again until April and May 1830, when he revised the text and provided an introduction and notes for the 'Magnum' edition in which it appeared as Volumes 22 and 23 in March and April 1831. (Note: For a description of the early editions see Alexander 1993, pp. 398–399, 408–415.)

The standard modern edition, by J. H. Alexander, was published in 1993 as Volume 11 of the Edinburgh Edition of the Waverley Novels: it is based on the first edition with emendations mainly from the manuscript; the Magnum material is included in Volume 25b.

== Plot summary ==
Giles Gosling, the innkeeper, had just welcomed his mischievous nephew Michael Lambourne on his return from Flanders. He invited the Cornishman, Tressilian, and other guests to drink with them. Lambourne made a wager he would obtain an introduction to a certain young lady under the steward Foster's charge at Cumnor Place, seat of the Earl of Leicester, and the Cornish stranger begged permission to accompany him. On arriving there Tressilian found that this lady was his former lady-love, Amy. He would have carried her back to her home, but she refused; and as he was leaving he quarrelled with Richard Varney, the earl's squire, and might have taken his life had not Lambourne intervened. Amy was soothed in her seclusion by costly presents from the earl, and during his next visit she pleaded that she might inform her father of their marriage, but he was afraid of Elizabeth's resentment.

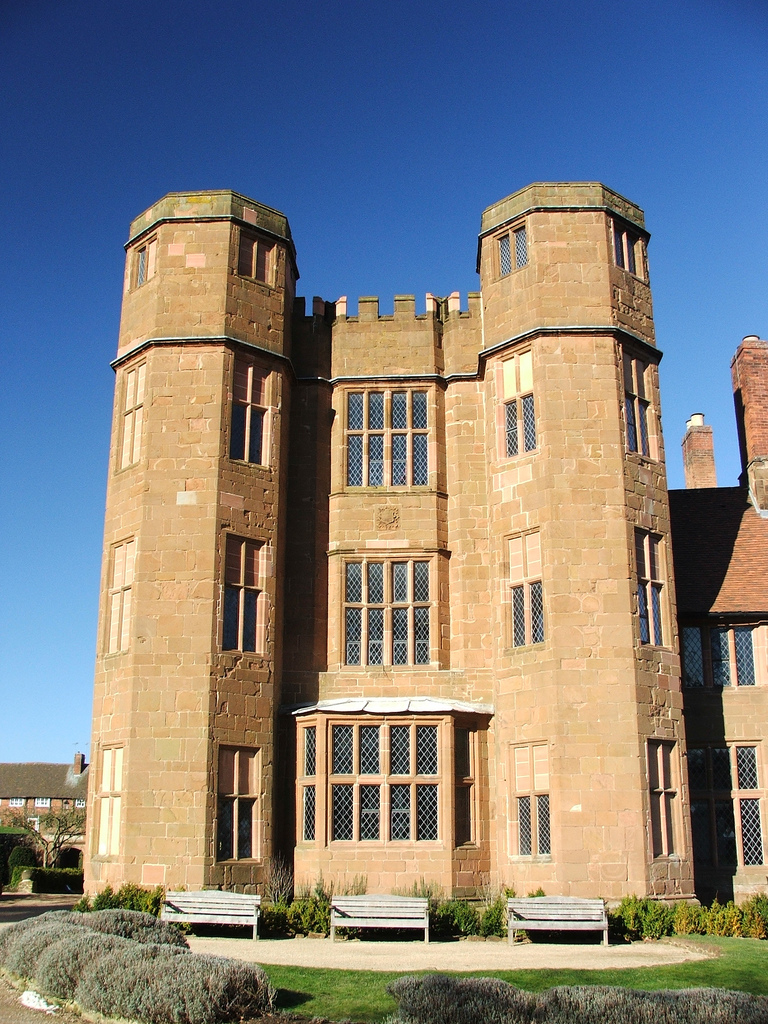
Kenilworth Castle's 16th-century gatehouse, built by Robert Dudley

Warned by his host against the squire, and having confided to him how Amy had been entrapped, Tressilian left Cumnor by night, and, after several adventures by the way, reached the residence of Sir Hugh Robsart, Amy's father, to assist him in laying his daughter's case before the queen. Returning to London, Tressilian's servant, Wayland Smith, cured the Earl of Sussex of a dangerous illness. On hearing about this from Walter Raleigh, Elizabeth at once set out to visit Leicester's rival, and it was in this way that Tressilian's petition, in Amy's behalf, was handed to her. The queen was agitated to learn of this secret marriage. Varney was accordingly summoned to the royal presence, but he boldly declared that Amy was his wife, and Leicester was restored to the queen's favour.

Tressilian's servant then gained access to the secret countess Amy as a pedlar, and, having hinted that Elizabeth would shortly marry the earl, sold her a cure for the heartache, warning her attendant Janet at the same time that there might be an attempt to poison her mistress. Meanwhile, Leicester was preparing to entertain the queen at Kenilworth, where she had commanded that Amy should be introduced to her, and Varney was, accordingly, despatched with a letter begging the countess to appear at the revels pretending to be Varney's bride. Having indignantly refused to do so, and having recovered from the effects of a cordial which had been prepared for her by the astrologer Alasco, she escaped, with the help of her maid, from Cumnor, and started for Kenilworth, escorted by Wayland Smith.

Travelling thither as brother and sister, they joined a party of mummers, and then, to avoid the crowd of people thronging the principal approaches, proceeded by circuitous by-paths to the castle. Having, with Dickie Sludge's help, passed into the courtyard, they were shown into a room, where Amy was waiting while her attendant carried a note to the earl, when she was startled by the entrance of Tressilian, whom she entreated not to interfere until after the expiration of twenty-four hours. On entering the park, Elizabeth was received by her favourite attended by a numerous cavalcade bearing waxen torches, and a variety of entertainments followed. During the evening she enquired for Varney's wife, and was told she was too ill to be present. Tressilian offered to lose his head if within twenty-four hours he did not prove the statement to be false. Nevertheless, the ostensible bridegroom was knighted by the queen.

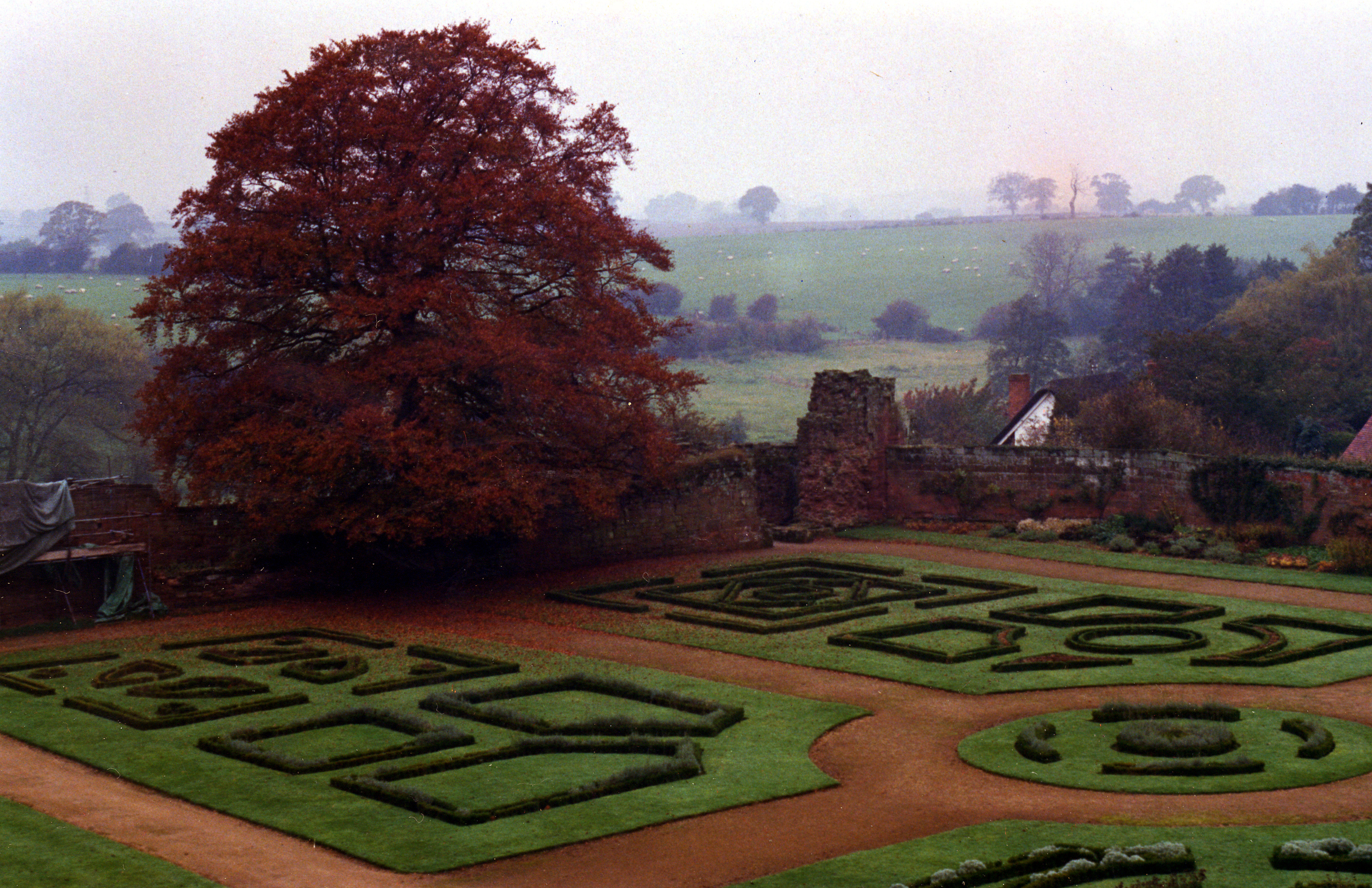
The Elizabethan Gardens at Kenilworth

Receiving no reply to her note, which Wayland had lost, Amy found her way the next morning to a grotto in the gardens, where she was discovered by Elizabeth, who had just told her host that "she must be the wife and mother of England alone." Falling on her knees the countess besought protection against Varney, who she declared was not her husband, and added that the Earl of Leicester knew all. The earl was instantly summoned to the royal presence, and would have been committed to the Tower, had not Amy recalled her words, when she was consigned to Lord Hunsdon's care as bereft of her reason, Varney coming forward and pretending that she had just escaped from a special treatment for her madness. Leicester insisted on an interview with her, when she implored him to confess their marriage to Elizabeth, and then, with a broken heart, told him that she would not long darken his brighter prospects. Varney, however, succeeded in persuading him that Amy had acted in connivance with Tressilian, and in obtaining medical sanction for her custody as mentally disordered, asking only for the earl's signet-ring as his authority. The next day a duel between Tressilian and the earl was interrupted by Dickie, who produced the countess's note, and, convinced of her innocence, Leicester confessed that she was his wife. With the queen's permission he at once deputed his rival and Sir Walter Raleigh to proceed to Cumnor, whither he had already despatched Lambourne, to stay his squire's further proceedings.

Varney, however, had shot the messenger on receiving his instructions, and had caused Amy to be conducted by Foster to an apartment reached by a long flight of stairs and a narrow wooden bridge. The following evening the tread of a horse was heard in the courtyard, and a whistle like the earl's signal, upon which she rushed from the room, and the instant she stepped on the bridge, it parted in the middle, and she fell to her death. Her murderer poisoned himself, and the skeleton of his accomplice was found, many years afterwards, in a cell where he secreted his money. The news of the countess's fate put an end to the revels at Kenilworth: Leicester retired for a time from Court, and Sir Hugh Robsart, who died very soon after his daughter, settled his estate on Tressilian. Leicester pressed for an impartial inquiry. Though the jury found that Amy's death was an accident (concluding that Lady Dudley, staying alone "in a certain chamber", had fallen down the adjoining stairs, sustaining two head injuries and breaking her neck), it was widely suspected that Leicester had arranged his wife's death to be able to marry the Queen.

== Characters ==
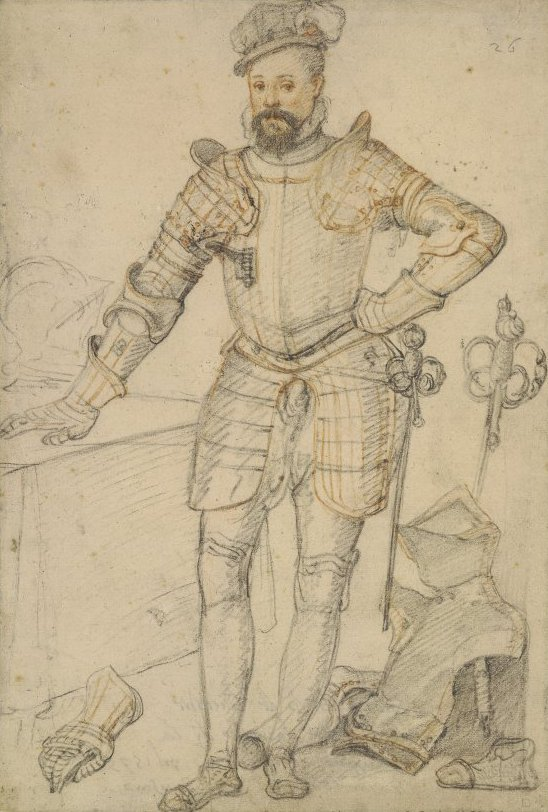
Robert Dudley, Earl of Leicester, in 1575

Principal characters in bold

- Giles Gosling, host of the 'Bonny Black Bear'
- **Michael Lambourne**, his nephew
- John Tapster
- Will Hostler
- Laurence Goldthread, a mercer
- **Edmund Tressilian**
- **Wayland Smith**
- Thomas Radcliffe, 3rd Earl of Sussex
- Sir Nicholas Blount, his master of house
- Sir Walter Raleigh
- **Robert Dudley**, Earl of Leicester
- **Richard Varney**, his follower
- **Anthony Forster**, warden of Cumnor Hall
- Janet, his daughter
- Erasmus Holiday, a schoolteacher
- **Dickie Sludge**, alias Flibbertigibbet
- Dr Demetrius Dobobbie, alias Alasco, an astrologer
- Master Crane, landlord of the 'Crane Inn' at Marlborough
- Dame Alison Crane, his wife
- Jack Hostler
- Gaffer Grimesby
- Sampson, a junior tapster
- Dame Crank, a laundress
- Sir Hugh Robsart, of Lidcote Hall
- **Amy Robsart**, his daughter
- Will Badger, his servant
- Michael Mumblazon, inmate of Lidcote Hall
- **Queen Elizabeth**
- Lord Hunsdon
- Lord Burleigh
- Dr Master, her physician
- Bowyer, an usher
- Laurence Staple, a warder

== Chapter summary ==
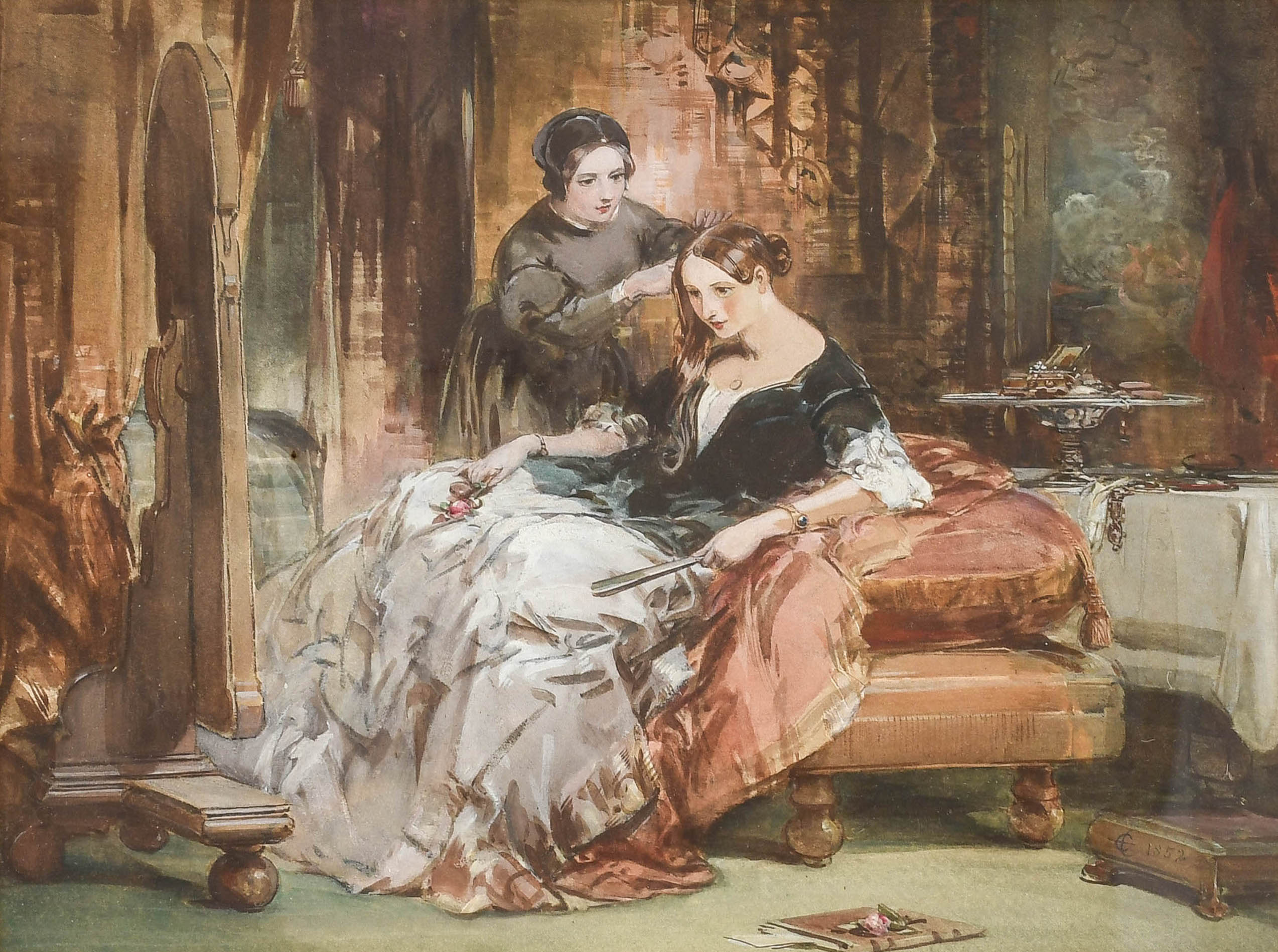
Amy Robsart and her maid, watercolour by George Cattermole, 1852

Volume One

Ch. 1: Michael Lambourne is welcomed back from abroad to the 'Bonny Black Bear' inn at Cumnor. Attention then shifts to the melancholy figure of Tressilian.

Ch. 2: Goldthread tells Lambourne and Tressilian that Anthony Forster is living in Cumnor Place with an attractive young woman [Amy Robsart], and Lambourne wagers that he will get Forster to introduce himself to her.

Ch. 3: Lambourne and Tressilian are received at Cumnor Place by Forster, whom Lambourne takes off for a private conversation.

Ch. 4: Lambourne and Forster explore the advantages of working together. Tressilian tries to persuade Amy to return to her father, who is seriously ill, but they are interrupted by Forster and Lambourne. Forced to leave, Tressilian encounters Richard Varney at the postern-door and they cross swords. Lambourne stops the fight and is instructed by Varney to shadow Tressilian.

Ch. 5: Varney brings Amy a letter from Leicester. Forster and Varney negotiate, and in soliloquy Varney professes his intention to possess Amy or ruin her.

Ch. 6: Amy delights in the newly refurbished rooms at Cumnor Place. Janet Forster warns her not to alienate Varney. He advises Amy not to tell Leicester about Tressilian's visit.

Ch. 7: On his arrival at Cumnor Place Leicester tells Amy that their relationship cannot be publicly acknowledged at this stage. He considers retiring from public life, but Varney dissuades him. Leicester speaks harshly of Tressilian, and Amy says nothing about his visit. The next morning Varney and Lambourne leave for Woodstock, preceded by Leicester who makes a public show of having spent the night there.

Ch. 8: The previous day, back at the inn, Tressilian snubs Lambourne. He tells the landlord Giles Gosling of his affection for Amy, and of how she had left Devon with Varney prompting his journey to find her. Giles advises him to return to Devon and make friends to further his interest at Court.

Ch. 9: In the Vale of Whitehorse, Tressilian's horse loses a shoe, and a schoolmaster, Erasmus Holiday, arranges for Dickie Sludge to conduct him to Wayland Smith, the former attendant of a quacksalver Demetrius Doboobie.

Ch. 10: Wayland shoes Tressilian's horse, and they enter the underground chamber at the smithy.

Ch. 11: Wayland tells Tressilian his story and agrees to act as his guide. After they have left the smithy Dickie (Flibbertigibbet) blows it up. They reach Marlborough, where news of the explosion has reached the inn.

Ch. 12: Tressilian and Wayland arrive at Lidcote Hall, where Wayland cures Sir Hugh Robsart with a potion. Wayland insists on serving Tressilian as he leaves for London on receipt of a summons from the Earl of Sussex who is ill.

Volume Two

Ch. 1 (13): Tressilian and Wayland arrive in London, where Wayland buys drugs before they move on to Deptford.

Ch. 2 (14): After Tressilian has chatted with Blount and Raleigh, he talks to Sussex and Wayland administers a potion.

Ch. 3 (15): Raleigh tells Tressilian and Blount that he has refused to admit the Queen's physician Dr Master. At Greenwich he justifies his action, and Elizabeth pays a brief and uneasy visit to Sussex, now convalescent.

Ch. 4 (16): Leicester (with Varney) and Sussex (with Tressilian) prepare separately for a showdown at Court. Elizabeth commands all of them to come to Kenilworth, Varney to bring Amy whom he claims to be his wife.

Ch. 5 (17): Leicester is hyperactive at Court and joins Raleigh on the Queen's barge in a discussion of stage plays. Elizabeth and Raleigh swap verses. Wayland tells Tressilian he has caught sight of Dr Doboobie and is sent to Cumnor to keep an eye on things there.

Ch. 6 (18): Leicester and Varney discuss tactics. Alasco (Doboobie), secretly prompted by Varney, warns Leicester of the danger posed by a youth from the west. Varney arranges with Alasco for Amy to be drugged to keep her from going to Kenilworth and sends him with Lambourne to Cumnor.

Ch. 7 (19): Lambourne wins a bet by getting Forster to come down to the 'Bonny Black Bear'. Advised by Giles, Wayland (disguised as a pedlar) sets off for Cumnor Place to take advantage of Forster's absence.

Ch. 8 (20): Wayland sells Amy wares, adding a medicine which he secretly informs Janet is an antidote to counter the drug which Alasco is planning to administer to her mistress. Wayland deduces Leicester's affection for Amy from the drunken ravings of Lambourne, who has come to Cumnor Place with Forster, Varney, and Alasco.

Ch. 9 (21): Varney persuades Leicester to ask Amy to act for a period as Varney's wife.

Ch. 10 (22): Amy indignantly rejects Varney's plan and tells Janet of her intention to escape. Janet prevents her from drinking Alasco's potion brought by Forster, but Varney has more success, as he reports to Alasco.

Ch. 11 (23): Janet plans and executes Amy's escape, entrusting her to Wayland's care.

Ch. 12 (24): Wayland steals Goldthread's horse for Amy and eventually restores it. They take cover with Holiday's troupe of amateur entertainers (including Holiday and Flibbertigibbet) bound for Kenilworth.

Ch. 13 (25): Having separated from the troupe Amy and Wayland arrive at Kenilworth.

Volume Three

Ch. 1 (26): Flibbertigibbet persuades the porter to admit the party to the castle. Amy asks Wayland to deliver a letter to Leicester, and Wayland resolves to tell Tressilian of her arrival.

Ch. 2 (27): Tressilian finds Amy placed in his chamber and agrees to wait for 24 hours before taking any action.

Ch. 3 (28): Tressilian encounters the drunken Lambourne.

Ch. 4 (29): Wayland confesses to Tressilian that he has lost Amy's letter to Leicester. Lambourne expels Wayland from the castle with the help of the warder Laurence Staples.

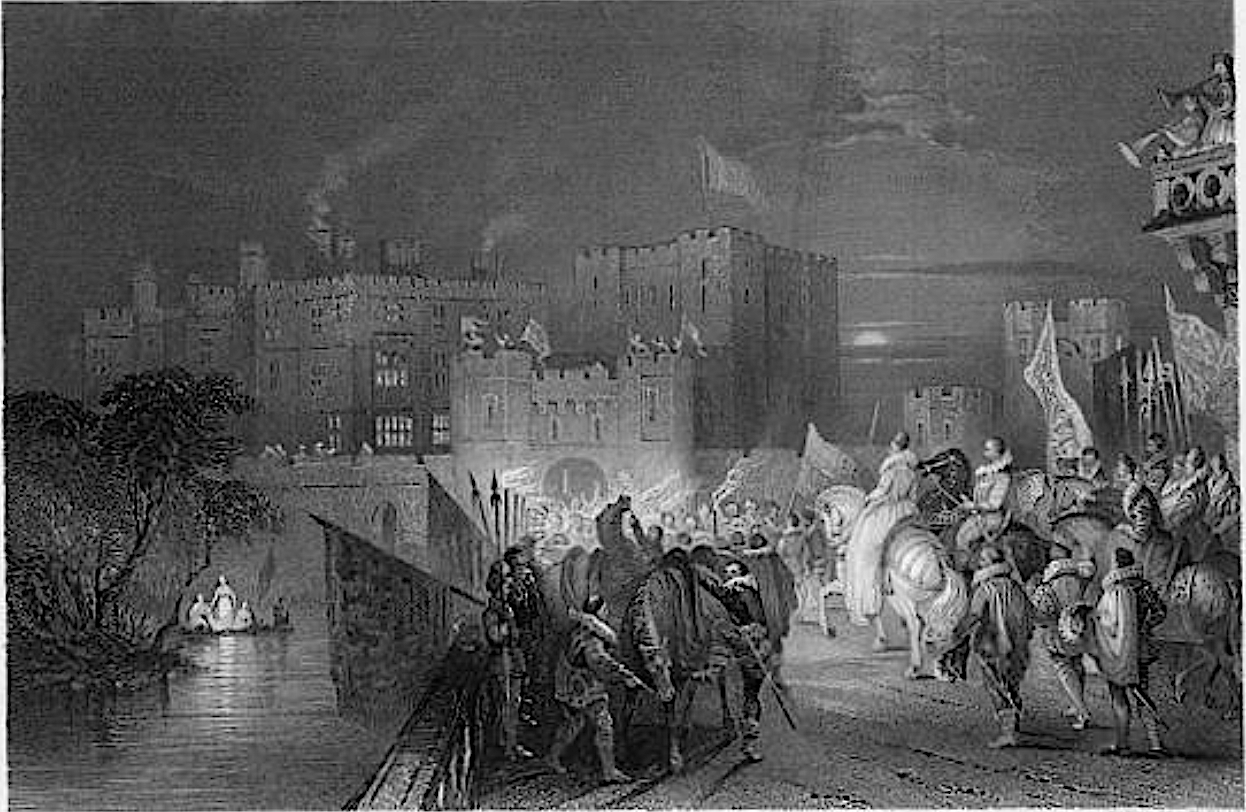
Elizabeth enters the castle with great ceremony, print after Thomas Allom

Ch. 5 (30): Elizabeth enters the castle with great ceremony.

Ch. 6 (31): Elizabeth thinks Tressilian is mad, and Raleigh and Blount confine him in Raleigh's lodgings.

Ch. 7 (32): Elizabeth knights Varney, Raleigh, and Blount. Varney works on Leicester, hinting at the advantages of murdering Amy.

Ch. 8 (33): Amy's mental suffering is exacerbated by the noises of revelry. Staples rescues her from Lambourne's attentions, and she escapes into the Pleasance.

Ch. 9 (34): Elizabeth rejects Leicester's advances in the Pleasance and encounters Amy, hearing her story. Leicester is arraigned as a result, but Varney saves the day by continuing to maintain that Amy is his wife, and that she is distracted.

Ch. 10 (35): Leicester insists to Varney that he must see Amy, and she stands her ground before her pretended husband.

Ch. 11 (36): Varney tells Leicester of Tressilian's visit to Cumnor Place, and, believing her to be unfaithful, the Earl decides she must die.

Ch. 12 (37): Varney manages to conduct himself in a more courtly manner than Leicester. He confirms the Earl in his desire for Amy's death. Elizabeth and Dr Master agree that Amy should leave the castle to be cared for by Varney as her supposed husband. The Queen is entertained with a celebratory national masque.

Ch. 13 (38): Leicester, learning that Varney has left the castle with Amy, entrusts Lambourne with a delaying letter to him. He meets Tressilian by appointment for a duel in the Pleasance, interrupted by a party of yeomen of the guard.

Ch. 14 (39): Elizabeth is entertained with a spectacular pageant. The resumed duel is interrupted by Flibbertigibbet, who presents Leicester with Amy's letter and tells how he acquired it.

Ch. 15 (40): Elizabeth elicits the truth from Leicester and dispatches Tressilian and Raleigh to apprehend Varney and Alasco. On the way they find Lambourne dying of a bullet wound.

Ch. 16 (41): Varney and Forster removed Amy from the castle. Varney shot Lambourne when he caught up with them. They arrange for Amy to fall to her death at Cumnor Place. Varney is arrested and kills himself. Forster flees, and his body is discovered in a concealed room long afterwards.

== Reception ==
Kenilworth was well received by most of the reviewers. (Note: For a full list of contemporaneous British reviews of Kenilworth see William S. Ward, Literary Reviews in British Periodicals, 1821‒1826: A Bibliography (New York and London, 1977), 173‒74. For an earlier annotated list see James Clarkson Corson, A Bibliography of Sir Walter Scott (Edinburgh and London, 1943), 240‒42.) With few exceptions they welcomed the unusual tightness of the structure, the vividness of the Court scenes, and the portrayal of Elizabeth, though there were a few objections to the highlighting of her foibles. The chapter depicting the afflictions of Sir Hugh Robsart was generally found affecting, and the very different presentation of Lambourne was also judged striking. Amy attracted a wide range of comments, the majority of them praising her moral stature. It was noted that the historical Leicester was partly sanitised by the transfer of some of his worst features to the villain Varney. Several reviewers praised the unusually dramatic qualities of the new novel, and there was much appreciation of the pervasive contrast of public splendour and private agony.

== Departures from historical fact ==
Much of the novel gives a fair depiction of the Elizabethan court, although the circumstances of Amy Robsart's death from a fall are greatly altered, and also many other events are a product of Scott's imagination. The death of Amy Robsart had been the subject of speculation for more than 200 years, and in 1810 Cumnor Place was pulled down, it was said, solely in order to lay her ghost to rest.

The reception at Kenilworth which provides the backdrop to the novel took place in 1575, and frequent references to how many years have passed since other events such as the Queen's accession, the deposition of Mary, Queen of Scots, and so forth, indicate that the novel is set in that year—but Amy Robsart died on 8 September 1560. The novel in effect conflates Dudley/Leicester's first two marriages. His first marriage, to Amy Robsart, was not in fact a closely guarded secret at all, and had taken place in 1550 in the presence of King Edward VI; its progress remained very widely discussed in court circles over the next decade. It was his second marriage in September 1578 to Lettice Knollys (with whom he had flirted in 1565) that was secret and caused the Queen's anger when she found out about it in 1579. Robert Dudley, 1st Earl of Leicester only received his earldom in 1564, and during his first wife's lifetime was "Lord Robert Dudley".

William Shakespeare, who was not even born until 1564, is mentioned in Chapter 17 as an adult and as being known at court, rubbing shoulders with Edmund Spenser, whose first major work The Shepheardes Calender was not published until 1579; and in Chapter 16, Queen Elizabeth even quotes from Troilus and Cressida, which was written around 1602.

The character of Sir Nicolas Blount seems to be broadly based on Sir Christopher Blount, who was in fact an official in the household of the Earl of Essex.

== Adaptations ==
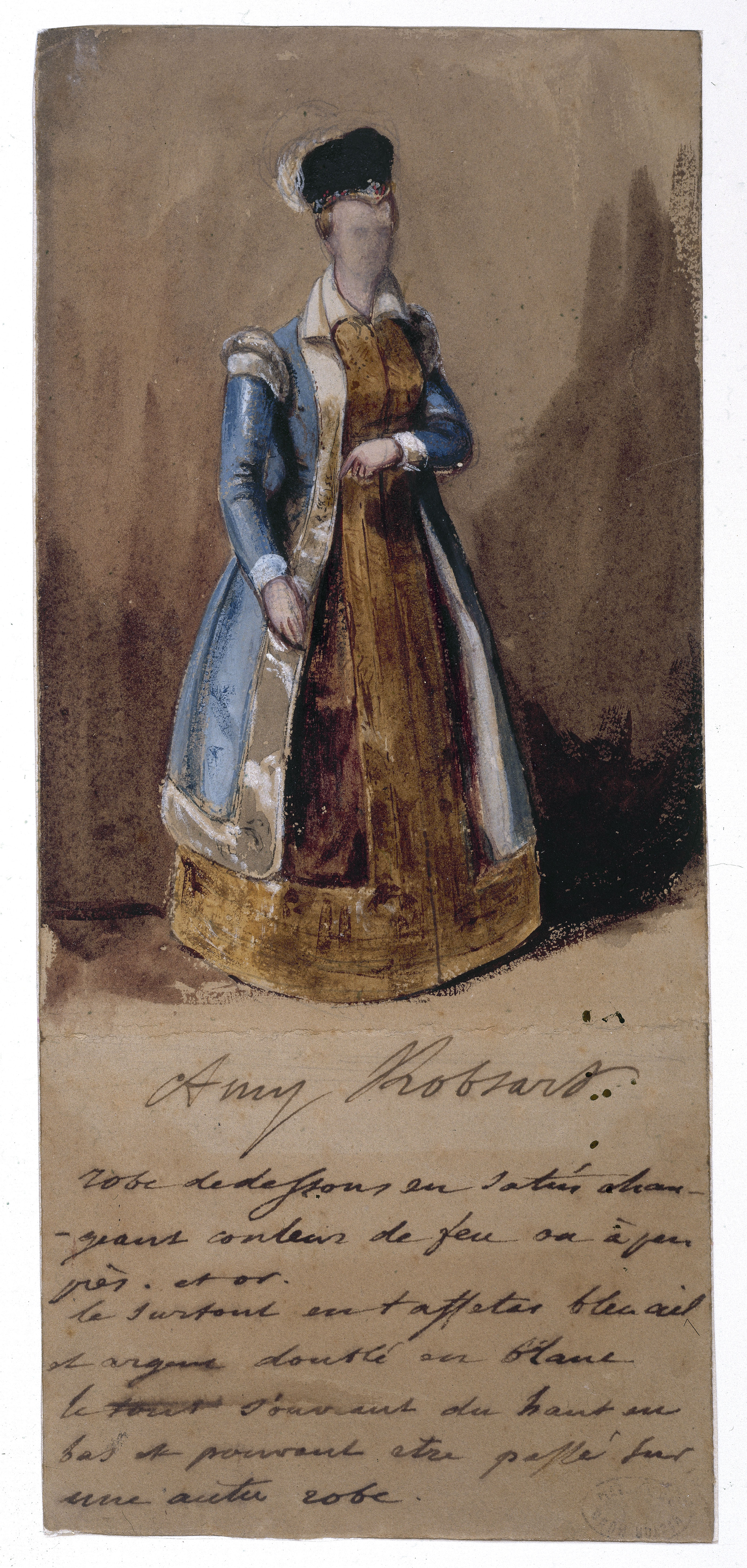
Costume design for Amy Robsart by Eugène Delacroix, 1821, for Victor Hugo's play Amy Robsart.

There was a first staging of Kenilworth on 8 March 1821 at the Theatre Royal, Covent Garden. Mary Vining took the role of Amy Robsart. Several other versions were produced shortly afterwards including one by Thomas Dibdin at the Surrey Theatre and another by James Planché at the Adelphi Theatre.

In 1822, the young Victor Hugo agreed with the elder Alexandre Soumet to write a five-act drama based on Scott's novel. Soumet had outlined the plot and was to write the last two acts, while Hugo was to write the first three. When they confronted the written materials, they agreed that their principles were incompatible. Each completed his own drama. Soumet's earnest Emilia was produced at the Odéon in 1823 with Mademoiselle Mars, while Hugo's Amy Robsart, freely mingling tragedy with comedy, was staged in 1828. Hugo's play Amy Robsart was a flop in Paris, despite costumes designed by Eugène Delacroix, but effectively provided the base for the libretto of Donizetti's opera of 1829.

Years later, in 1859, the María´s author and poet, Jorge Isaacs made an adaptation to theater: Amy Robsart, however, at that time his work did not receive the importance it deserved; nowadays the writer's playwright facet is recognized.

Amy Robsart, a four-act adaptation by Andrew Halliday, opened at the Theatre Royal, Drury Lane in London on 24 September 1870. The title role was played by Adelaide Neilson and four minor parts were taken by members of the Vokes family. The piece closed on 17 December, after playing 105 performances, but was revived four times, in 1871, 1873, 1874 and 1877, becoming one of the most successful Drury Lane shows of the Victorian period.

In 1957 the novel was adapted into a six-part BBC television series Kenilworth, now believed to be lost.

Several operas have been based on Kenilworth, including:

- Auber's Leicester, ou Le Château de Kenilworth from 1825
- Gaetano Donizetti's 1829 opera Elisabetta al castello di Kenilworth is loosely based on Scott's novel.
- Christoph Ernst Friedrich Weyse's Festen paa Kenilworth in 1836, to a text by Hans Christian Andersen
- Eugen Seidelmann's Das Fest zu Kenilworth in 1843
- Francesco Schira's Kenilworth composed in 1848, intended for Sims Reeves at Covent Garden but never produced.
- Luigi Badia's Il Conte di Leicester in 1851
- Isidore de Lara's Amy Robsart in 1893
- Bruno Klein's Kenilworth, with libretto by fellow New Yorker Wilhelm Müller. It was staged in 1894 in Hamburg.
- Harvey Löhr's Kenilworth written in 1906, never produced
- Alfredo Schiuma's Amy Robsart from 1920

Other musical adaptations include:

- An 1831 ballet Kenilworth by Michael Costa
- The 1864 cantata The Masque at Kenilworth with words by Henry Fothergill Chorley and music by Arthur Sullivan
- The 1867 Broadway musical Kenilworth, music by Michael Connolly, book by Frederic Lawrence and H.S. Murdoch, revived several times in the next decade.
- A Kenilworth overture by Robert Lucas Pearsall

== Allusions to the novel ==
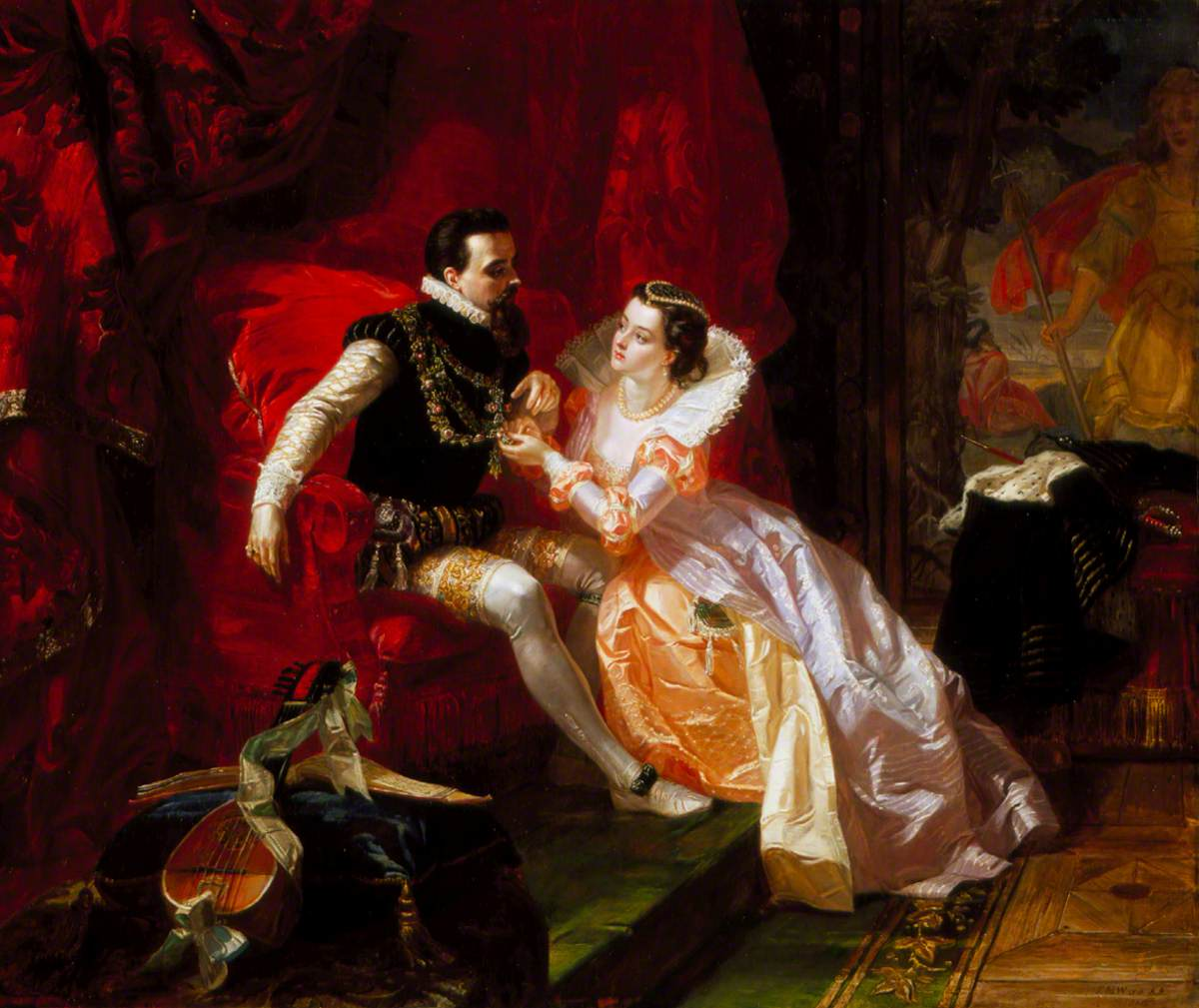
Leicester and Amy Robsart at Cumnor Hall by Edward Matthew Ward, 1866

Letitia Elizabeth Landon's poetical illustration Queen Elizabeth’s Entrance into Kenilworth., to an engraving of a painting by Thomas Allom in Fisher's Drawing Room Scrap Book (1839) references Amy in this novel from the start ("Lonely sits the lovely lady, Lonely in the tower"). Landon was a devotee of Scott's novels.

In Balzac's 1841 novel Ursule Mirouët the villainous Goupil warns the fledgling barrister Desire against marrying for a whim, threatening to crush the woman "like Varney crushes Amy Robsart in Kenilworth".

In keeping with the city's many Walter Scott references, Rose Street in Edinburgh has a pub called The Kenilworth, which was established in 1904.

Portland, Oregon, has a neighborhood called Creston-Kenilworth, the latter part of which is named for the novel.

The Elvetham Hotel near to the village of Hartley Wintney in Hampshire, England, is one of the former homes of the barons Calthorpe. The bar in the hotel has an ornate ceiling decorated with characters from the Kenilworth novel.

== Translation ==
The novel was immediately translated into French by Jacques-Théodore Parisot (1783-1840) under the title Le château de Kenilworth (1821). Other translations followed, such as into German in 1827 and Polish in 1828.

== Sources ==
- Scott, Walter (1993). Alexander, J. H. (ed.). Kenilworth: A Romance. Edinburgh: Edinburgh University Press.
- Clarence, Reginald (1970) [1909]. "The Stage" Cyclopædia: A Bibliography of Plays. New York: Burt Franklin. ISBN 0-8337-0581-4.
- Landon, Letitia Elizabeth (1838). Fisher's Drawing Room Scrap-Book. Fisher, Son & Co.
- Reynolds, K. D. (23 September 2004). "Vining family (per. 1807–1915), actors". Oxford Dictionary of National Biography. Vol. 1 (online ed.). Oxford University Press. doi:10.1093/ref:odnb/53565. ISBN 978-0-19-861412-8. (Subscription, Wikipedia Library access or UK public library membership required.)
- "Chatterton's Seasons at Drury Lane" (PDF). History of the Theatre Royal Drury Lane.
- Mitchell, Jerome (1976). The Walter Scott Operas. An Analysis of Operas Based on the Works of Sir Walter Scott. University of Alabama Press. ISBN 9780817364014
- Mitchell, Jerome (1996). More Scott Operas. Further Analyses of Operas Based on the Works of Sir Walter Scott. University Press of America. ISBN 9780761802600.
