= Mary Vining =

English actress

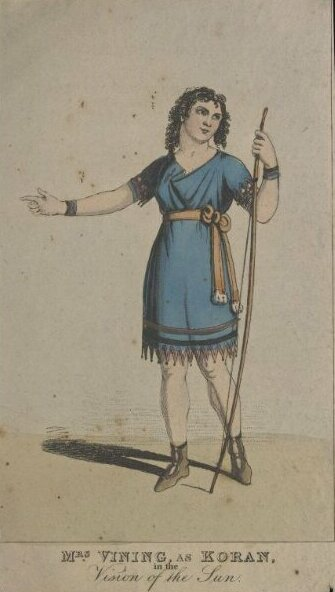
- Born: Mary Johannet or Johannot; 1790
- Died: January 20, 1868 (aged 77–78)
- Occupation: actress
- Spouse: William Vining

Mary Gossop Vining born Mary Johannot? aka Mrs Vining (1790–1868), was an English actress headlining at the Theatre Royal, Covent Garden.

== Life ==
She is believed by some sources to have first appeared as a dancer under the name "Miss Johannet" or "Miss Johannot". At some point she married into the noted theatrical family of Vining. Her husband was William Vining who first acted in 1819.

Vining made a good impression as an actress at Bath in 1813 and 1814.

There was a first staging of a play based on Sir Walter Scott's new novel Kenilworth on 8 March 1821 at the Covent Garden theatre. Vining took the role of leading role of Amy Robsart. Within the week she was appearing again as Lady Anne in a version of Richard III with the leading actor William Charles Macready in the title role.

In 1837 an earthenware figure was created of Mrs Vining playing the title role of "Peter Wilkins". The play which was staged at the Theatre Royal Covent Garden in 1827, is based around her character, Peter Wilkins, who is stranded on an antarctic island where he falls in love with a fairy like flying character named Yourawkee. Yourawkee was played by Mary Glover. One example of this ceramic figure is in the Victoria & Albert Museum. The ceramic figure is based on an 1827 engraving of her as Peter Wilkins performing the dance of the castanets.

She and her husband lived in Campden Town which is where he died in 1861.

== Death and legacy ==
She died on 20 January 1868. Paintings or engravings exist of her playing Florio in The Forest of Bondy or The Dog of Montargis by James Meadows in the V&A. There is also in image of her as Koran in The Vision of the Sun.
