= Saioa Hernández =

Spanish opera singer

Saioa Hernández (born 26 March 1983 in Madrid) is a Spanish operatic soprano.

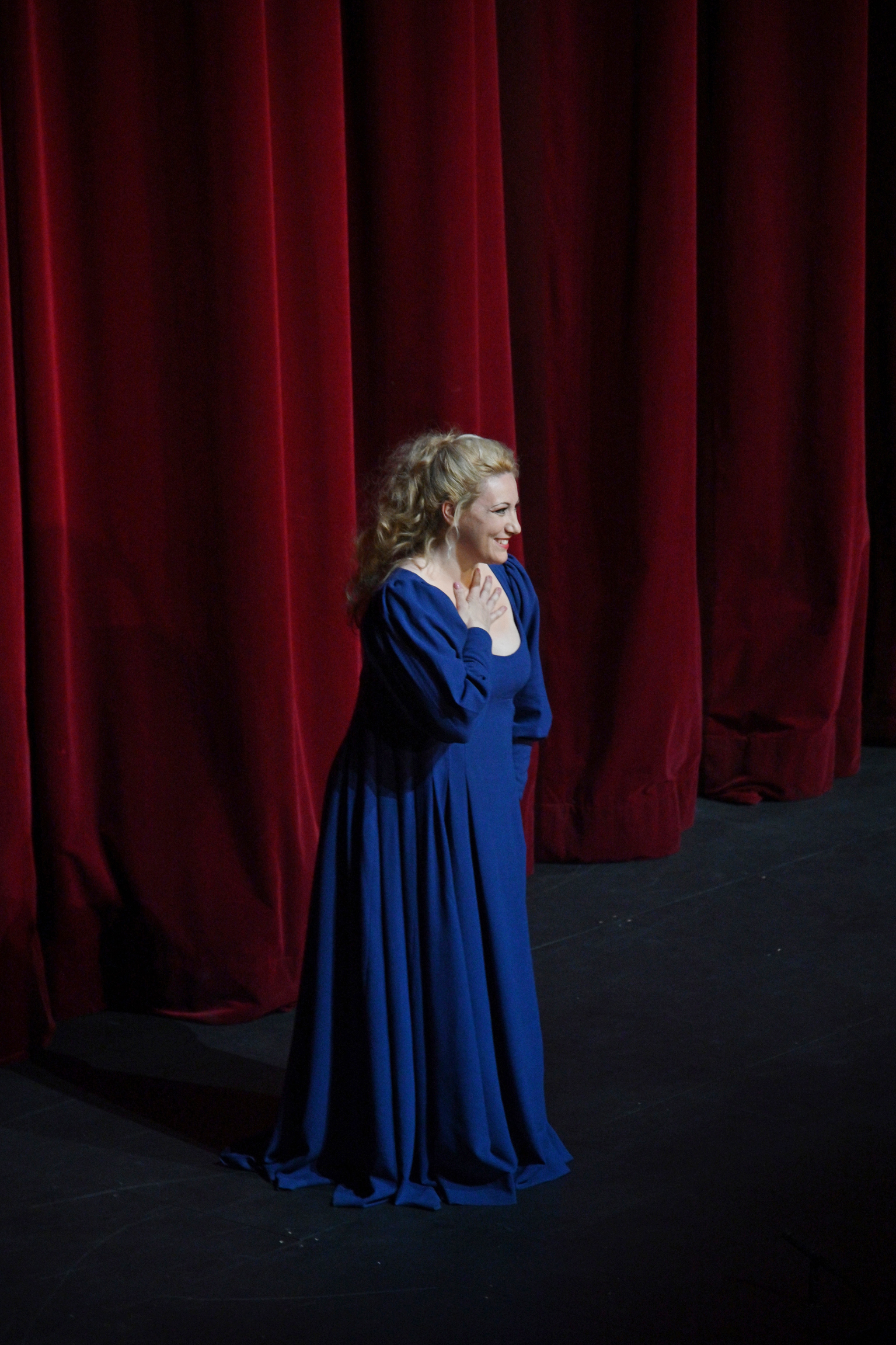
Saioa Hernandez

== Career ==
Hernández studied singing with sopranos Renata Scotto and Montserrat Caballé, among others. She began her career performing in zarzuela in Madrid and then performed various roles with Spanish opera companies. Saioa Hernández achieved international recognition when she performed the leading role of Odabella in Verdi's opera Attila conducted by Riccardo Chailly at the opening night of La Scala's season in Milan in 2018, a performance which was broadcast and televised worldwide. She returned to La Scala in 2019 in the title role of Tosca, which she has also performed at the Verona Arena and the Deutsche Oper Berlin. Other notable performances include the title role of La Gioconda at the Liceu in Barcelona; her debut at the Royal Opera House London as Maddalena di Coigny in Andrea Chénier; and Abigaille in Verdi's Nabucco at the Semperoper Dresden and at the Verdi Festival in Parma.

== Recording ==
Bellini, Zaira, issued 2016. CD:Bongiovanni, Cat:GB2565/66
