= Kenilworth (play) =

1821 play

- Original language: English
- Written by: Alfred Bunn
- Genre: Melodrama
- Setting: Elizabethan England

Premiere
- Date: 8 March 1821
- Place: Theatre Royal, Covent Garden, London

Kenilworth is an 1821 historical play by the British writer Alfred Bunn. A melodrama, based on the novel of the same title by Walter Scott, it premiered at the Theatre Royal, Covent Garden in London on 8 March 1821. A separate adaptation of the novel by Thomas Dibdin appeared at the Surrey Theatre the same year. The original Covent Garden cast included John Vandenhoff as the Earl of Leicester, William Abbot as Varney, Henry Erskine Johnston as Sir Walter Raleigh, Charles Connor as Tresilian, Thomas Comer as Michael Lambourne, Charles Farley as Antony Foster, Harriet Faucit as Queen Elizabeth and Mary Vining as Amy Robsart (Countess of Leicester).

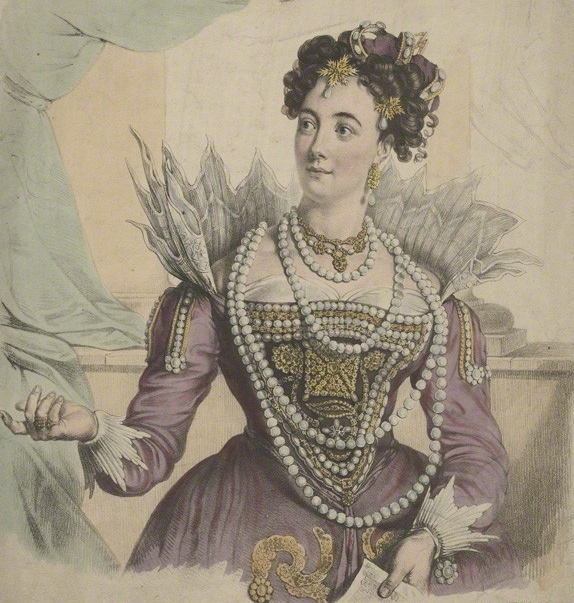
Margaret Agnes Bunn as Queen Elizabeth, c.1823

== Bibliography ==
- Bolton, H. Philip. Scott Dramatized. Mansell, 1992.
- Genest, John. Some Account of the English Stage: From the Restoration in 1660 to 1830, Volume 9. H.E. Carrington, 1832.
- Henderson, Diana E. Collaborations with the Past: Reshaping Shakespeare across Time and Media. Cornell University Press, 5 Sept 2018
- Nicoll, Allardyce. A History of Early Nineteenth Century Drama 1800-1850. Cambridge University Press, 1930.
