= Deaths in October 2020 =

The following is a list of notable deaths in October 2020.

Entries for each day are listed alphabetically by surname. A typical entry lists information in the following sequence:

- Name, age, country of citizenship at birth, subsequent country of citizenship (if applicable), reason for notability, cause of death (if known), and reference.

== October 2020 ==
=== 1 ===
- Simonluca Agazzone, 39, Italian footballer (SPAL, Carrarese, Novara), traffic collision.
- Serhiy Atelkin, 48, Ukrainian footballer (Shakhtar Donetsk, Lecce, national team), heart attack.
- Arnie Bench, 89, Australian footballer (Fitzroy).
- Tony Blue, 84, Australian Olympic athlete (1960, 1964).
- Gord Brooks, 70, Canadian ice hockey player (St. Louis Blues, Washington Capitals).
- Robbie Brunton, 47, Irish footballer (Sligo Rovers, Coleraine, Bohemians).
- Joe DeMeo, 79, American wrestling coach.
- Glen Despins, 56, Canadian curler, traffic collision.
- Zef Eisenberg, 47, British motorcycle racer, health supplement executive and television presenter, offroad racing crash.
- Hans Eriksen, 84, Norwegian Sámi politician, teacher, and radio broadcaster (NRK Sámi Radio), member of the Sámi Parliament of Norway (2009–2013).
- Michel Forget, 93, French aviator.
- Khurto Hajji Ismail, 87, Iraqi Yazidi religious leader.
- Maud Hansson, 82, Swedish actress (Emil i Lönneberga).
- Gary Hayman, 69, American football player (Buffalo Bills).
- Maurice Houdayer, 89, French Olympic rower (1956).
- Franck André Jamme, 72, French poet.
- Lou Johnson, 86, American baseball player (Los Angeles Dodgers).
- Derek Mahon, 78, Irish poet.
- Barry Mahy, 78, English-American soccer player (New York Generals, New York Cosmos, U.S. national team).
- Alfredo Marañon, 84, Filipino politician, mayor of Sagay City (2001–2010) and Governor of Negros Occidental (2010–2019), heart disease.
- Dan Muhlbauer, 62, American politician, member of the Iowa House of Representatives (2011–2015).
- Winfred Peppinck, 74, Dutch-born Australian author and diplomat.
- Murray Schisgal, 93, American playwright (Luv, Jimmy Shine) and screenwriter (Tootsie).
- Michael Spivak, 80, American mathematician.
- Ray Styles, 31, Ghanaian pencil artist, liver cancer.

=== 2 ===
- Shaher Abdulhak, 81–82, Yemeni businessman.
- Fadma Abi, Moroccan surgeon and professor, COVID-19.
- Alan Abraham, 89, Canadian politician, Lieutenant Governor of Nova Scotia (1984–1989).
- John Joseph Campion, 57, Irish-American entrepreneur, leukemia.
- Héctor Cavallero, 81, Argentine politician, mayor of Rosario, Santa Fe (1989–1995) and Deputy (1999–2003).
- Riley Darnell, 80, American politician, Tennessee Secretary of State (1993–2009), member of the Tennessee Senate (1981–1993) and House of Representatives (1971–1981).
- Zeki Ergezen, 70, Turkish politician, Minister of Public Works and Housing (2002–2005).
- Edward S. Feldman, 91, American film producer (Witness, The Truman Show, The Golden Child).
- Bob Gibson, 84, American Hall of Fame baseball player (St. Louis Cardinals), Cy Young Award (1968, 1970), World Series champion (1964, 1967), pancreatic cancer.
- Bette Greene, 86, American novelist (Summer of My German Soldier, Philip Hall Likes Me, I Reckon Maybe), heart failure.
- Martin Havelka, 62, Czech actor.
- Anne-Marie Hutchinson, 63, British lawyer.
- Seiuemon Inaba, 95, Japanese roboticist.
- Heinz Kördell, 88, German footballer (Schalke 04, Schwarz-Weiß Essen, West Germany national team).
- Liew Vui Keong, 60, Malaysian politician, MP (2008–2013, since 2018) and Minister in the Prime Minister's Department (2018–2020), pneumonia.
- Danny Malloy, 91, Scottish boxer.
- Ron Perranoski, 84, American baseball player (Los Angeles Dodgers, Minnesota Twins) and coach (San Francisco Giants), World Series champion (1963, 1965, 1981, 1988).
- Mukarrama Qosimova, 87, Tajik linguist and academic.
- Chris Ryder, 73, Northern Irish journalist and author.
- Irina Slavina, 47, Russian news editor (Open Russia), suicide by self-immolation.
- Sprangalang, 71, Trinidadian actor (Lord Have Mercy!, A Winter Tale) and comedian.
- Claude Vigée, 99, French poet.
- Mirjana Vukićević-Karabin, 86, Serbian astrophysicist.
- Victor Zalgaller, 99, Russian-Israeli mathematician.

=== 3 ===
- Anthony S. Abbott, 85, American educator and author.
- Mark Andrews, 94, American politician, member of the U.S. House of Representatives (1963–1981) and Senate (1981–1987).
- Haji Hussain Ansari, 73, Indian politician, Jharkhand MLA (1995–2004, 2009–2015, since 2019), cardiac arrest from COVID-19.
- JeAnne Burg, 82, American environmental statistician.
- Thomas Jefferson Byrd, 70, American actor (Clockers, Bulworth, Ray), shot.
- Karel Fiala, 95, Czech operatic tenor and actor (Dalibor, Lemonade Joe, Amadeus).
- Anthony Galindo, 41, Venezuelan singer (Menudo, MDO), suicide by hanging.
- P. Wayne Goode, 83, American politician, member of the Missouri House of Representatives (1963–1985) and Senate (1985–2005), leukemia.
- Charlie Haeger, 37, American baseball player (Chicago White Sox, San Diego Padres, Los Angeles Dodgers), suicide by gunshot.
- Sandy Keith, 91, American jurist and politician, Lieutenant Governor (1963–1967), state senator (1959–1963) and Chief Justice of the Supreme Court (1990–1998) of Minnesota.
- Armelia McQueen, 68, American actress (Adventures in Wonderland, Ain't Misbehavin', Ghost).
- Wendell Tangborn, 93, American glaciologist.
- Karsten Thielker, 54, German photographer, esophageal cancer.
- Dick Van Raaphorst, 77, American football player (Dallas Cowboys, San Diego Chargers).
- Bob Wilson, 77, English footballer (Cardiff City, Exeter City).
- Richard Woitach, 85, American conductor and pianist.

=== 4 ===
- Rosemary Aluoch, 44, Kenyan footballer (Kampala Capital City Authority FC, OC Bukavu Dawa, national team).
- Vishal Anand, 82, Indian actor (Sa-Re-Ga-Ma-Pa, Hindustan Ki Kasam, Chalte Chalte), film director and producer.
- Jean-Marc Avocat, 71–72, French actor (Verdict, Kaamelott).
- Aldridge Bousfield, 79, American mathematician.
- Jan des Bouvrie, 78, Dutch designer.
- Günter de Bruyn, 93, German author.
- Giovanni D'Alise, 72, Italian Roman Catholic prelate, Bishop of Ariano Irpino-Lacedonia (2004–2014) and Caserta (since 2014), COVID-19.
- Louis Fortier, 66, Canadian biologist and oceanographer, leukemia.
- Mike Foster, 90, American politician, Governor of Louisiana (1996–2004) and member of the Louisiana Senate (1988–1996).
- Jérôme Gendre, 43, French rugby union player (RC Narbonne), heart attack.
- Mordechai Yissachar Ber Leifer, 64, American-born Israeli Hasidic rabbi, rebbe of the Pittsburgh Dynasty (since 1990), COVID-19.
- Pradeep Maharathy, 65, Indian politician, Odisha MLA (1985–1995, since 2000), COVID-19.
- Zuza Homem de Mello, 87, Brazilian journalist and musicologist, heart attack.
- Paula Menyuk, 91, American linguist.
- Clark Middleton, 63, American actor (Sin City, Snowpiercer, Twin Peaks), West Nile virus.
- Carla Federica Nespolo, 77, Italian politician, MP (1976–1992) and President of ANPI (since 2017).
- Marietta Roberts, 77, Canadian politician.
- Philippe Salaün, 77, French photographer, cancer.
- Ibnu Saleh, 58, Indonesian politician, Regent of Central Bangka (since 2017), COVID-19.
- Richard Schifter, 97, American attorney and diplomat, Assistant Secretary of State for Democracy, Human Rights, and Labor (1985–1992).
- Kenzō Takada, 81, Japanese-French fashion designer and painter, founder of Kenzo, COVID-19.
- Sir Peregrine Worsthorne, 96, British journalist and newspaper editor (The Sunday Telegraph).
- Mulayam Singh Yadav, 92, Indian politician.
- Renzo Zaffanella, 90, Italian politician, mayor of Cremona (1980–1990).

=== 5 ===
- Pedro Aderito, 44, Angolan chess player.
- David Andahl, 55, American politician and rancher, COVID-19.
- Béatrice Arnac, 89, French actress and singer.
- Franco Bolelli, 70, Italian philosopher.
- Dirk Bootsma, 84, Dutch geneticist.
- Tommy Cullen, 81, Irish Gaelic footballer (Offaly).
- Anantkumar Surendraray Dave, 62, Indian jurist, judge (2004–2019) and acting Chief Justice (2018–2019) of the Gujarat High Court.
- Anil Devgan, 51, Indian film director (Raju Chacha, Blackmail, Haal-e-Dil), cardiac arrest.
- Charles Drury, 83, English footballer (West Bromwich Albion, Bristol City, Bradford (Park Avenue)).
- Clive Emsley, 76, British historian and criminologist.
- Joshua N. Goldberg, 95, American physicist and educator.
- Simon Gutman, 97, Polish-born French Holocaust survivor.
- Monsur Ul Karim, 70, Bangladeshi painter, heart disease and pneumonia.
- Daniel Knuth, 75, American politician, complications from Alzheimer's disease.
- Rasheed Masood, 73, Indian politician, MP (1977–1984, 1989–1996, 2004–2009) and Minister of Health and Family Welfare (1990), complications from COVID-19.
- Margaret Nolan, 76, English actress (Goldfinger, Carry On at Your Convenience, A Hard Day's Night), model, and artist.
- Monica Roberts, 58, American transgender rights advocate, pulmonary embolism
- Pietro Scandelli, 78, Italian racing cyclist.
- John Tanner, 93, New Zealand rugby union player (Otago, Auckland, national team).
- K. K. Usha, 81, Indian jurist, judge (1991–2000) and Chief Justice (2000–2001) of the Kerala High Court, complications from spinal cord surgery.
- Sir John Webster, 87, British vice admiral, Flag Officer, Plymouth (1987–1990).

=== 6 ===
- John Baring, 7th Baron Ashburton, 91, British hereditary peer and merchant banker, Chairman of the Board of BP (1992–1995).
- Folker Bohnet, 83, German actor (The Bridge, Ludwig).
- Alfons Borrell i Palazón, 89, Spanish abstract painter.
- Vincent Brady, 84, Irish politician.
- Joseph Bruno, 91, American politician, member (1977–2008) and majority leader (1994–2008) of the New York State Senate, prostate cancer.
- J. Russell Capps, 89, American politician, member of the North Carolina House of Representatives (1994–2006).
- Harold G. Chaffee, 94, American college football player (Colorado A&M) and coach (Nebraska Wesleyan).
- Deborah Cook, 65, Canadian philosopher.
- Olivier Corpet, 71, French writer and engineer.
- Herbert Feuerstein, 83, German comedian and journalist.
- Yves Gérard, 88, French musicologist, cancer.
- Oļegs Karavajevs, 59, Latvian footballer (Ska-Khabarovsk, Fakel Voronezh, national team).
- Ruth Klüger, 88, Austrian-born American Holocaust survivor and memoirist.
- Bunny Lee, 79, Jamaican reggae producer.
- Suleiman Mahmoud, 71, Libyan military officer, Chief of Staff of the National Liberation Army (2011), COVID-19.
- Izumi Matsumoto, 61, Japanese manga artist (Kimagure Orange Road).
- Tommy McClung, 87, Scottish rugby union player.
- Yasuto Mushiake, 99, Japanese electrical engineer.
- Johnny Nash, 80, American singer-songwriter ("I Can See Clearly Now", "Hold Me Tight", "Tears on My Pillow").
- Patricia Obregón, 68, Costa Rican Olympic archer.
- Tommy Rall, 90, American actor (Kiss Me Kate, Seven Brides for Seven Brothers, World in My Corner) and dancer, heart failure.
- Arthur P. Shimamura, 66, American neuropsychologist.
- Najeeb Tarakai, 29, Afghan cricketer (Afghan Cheetahs, national team), head injury sustained in traffic collision.
- Bernard Trink, 89, American-born Thai journalist (Bangkok Post), blood infection.
- Nosratollah Vahdat, 95, Iranian comedian, actor and film director, pneumonia.
- Eddie Van Halen, 65, Dutch-born American Hall of Fame musician (Van Halen) and songwriter ("Eruption", "Panama"), Grammy winner (1992), throat cancer.
- Jim Weaver, 93, American politician, member of the U.S. House of Representatives (1975–1987).
- Fred Wenz, 79, American baseball player (Boston Red Sox, Philadelphia Phillies).
- Wladimir Yordanoff, 66, Monégasque-born French actor (Vincent & Theo, Mark of an Angel, An Officer and a Spy).

=== 7 ===
- Alexander Alexeev, 82, Russian conductor.
- Kim Batiste, 52, American baseball player (Philadelphia Phillies, San Francisco Giants, Chinatrust Whales), complications from kidney surgery.
- Nabil Bechaouch, 49–50, Tunisian footballer (Olympique Béja, national team), heart attack.
- Antony Carbone, 95, Italian-born American actor (The Pit and the Pendulum, Last Woman on Earth, Creature from the Haunted Sea).
- Geoffrey Dyer, 73, Australian artist, Archibald Prize winner (2003).
- Tex Fuller, 94, English stuntman (Brazil, Willow, The Company of Wolves).
- Lloyd D. George, 90, American jurist, Judge (since 1984) and Chief Judge (1992–1997) of the U.S. District Court for Nevada.
- Manuel Guerra, 92, Spanish Olympic swimmer (1948).
- Eitan Haber, 80, Israeli journalist and publicist, colorectal cancer.
- Ernie Hills, 90, Australian rugby union player.
- Jerzy Jokiel, 89, Polish Olympic gymnast.
- Tom Kennedy, 93, American game show host (Name That Tune, Password Plus, You Don't Say!).
- Ashwani Kumar, 69, Indian police officer, Director of CBI (2008–2010), Governor of Nagaland (2013–2014) and Manipur (2013), suicide by hanging.
- Jean Martin, 92, French pianist.
- Mario Molina, 77, Mexican chemist, Nobel Prize laureate (1995), heart attack.
- Ignacio Ordóñez, 54, Spanish Olympic wrestler.
- Ray Pennington, 86, American country singer-songwriter ("I'm a Ramblin' Man"), house fire.
- Lucie Peyraud, 102, French winemaker and cook.
- Peter Sleight, 91, English cardiologist.
- Yury Suslin, 85, Russian Olympic rower.
- Kyōhei Tsutsumi, 80, Japanese composer, aspiration pneumonia.
- Károly Vekov, 73, Hungarian historian, professor, and politician.

=== 8 ===
- George B. Arfken, 97, American theoretical physicist.
- Dan Baum, 64, American journalist and author, glioblastoma.
- Camillo Bazzoni, 85, Italian film director (Suicide Commandos, A Long Ride from Hell, Mafia Connection) and cinematographer.
- Sylvie Bélanger, 69, Canadian artist, cancer.
- Sam Burton, 93, English footballer (Swindon Town), cancer.
- Choi Yun-chil, 92, South Korean Olympic long-distance runner (1948, 1952).
- Vladimir Dolgikh, 95, Russian politician, Senator (2013–2018) and candidate member of the Politburo (1982–1988).
- Jim Dwyer, 63, American journalist (New York Newsday, The New York Times) and writer (102 Minutes), Pulitzer Prize winner (1992, 1995), lung cancer.
- Whitey Ford, 91, American Hall of Fame baseball player (New York Yankees), Cy Young Award (1961), World Series champion (1950, 1953, 1956, 1958, 1961, 1962), dementia.
- Ali Khalif Galaydh, 78, Somali politician, Prime Minister (2000–2001), MP (since 2012) and President of Khatumo State (since 2014).
- Shlomo Gazit, 93, Israeli general, president of Ben-Gurion University (1982–1985) and general director of the Jewish Agency (1985–1987).
- Egon Gindorf, 89, German-born French entrepreneur, President of RC Strasbourg Alsace (2003–2005).
- Helen Lachs Ginsburg, 91, American economist.
- Miguel Giubergia, 67, Argentine lawyer and politician, Deputy (1999–2011), COVID-19.
- Larry Hollenbeck, 71, American racecar driver (NASCAR).
- David Ipp, 82, South African-born Australian lawyer and judge.
- Brian Locking, 81, English rock bass guitarist (The Shadows), bladder cancer.
- Charles Moore, 91, American athlete, Olympic champion (1952).
- Tom O'Donnell, 94, Irish politician, Minister for Community, Rural and Gaeltacht Affairs (1973–1977) and MEP (1979–1984).
- Ram Vilas Paswan, 74, Indian politician, MP (1977–1984, 1989–1991, 1996–2009, since 2010), Minister of Railways (1996–1998) and Labour (1989–1990).
- Geoff Peddle, 57, Canadian Anglican prelate, Bishop of Eastern Newfoundland and Labrador (since 2014).
- Joseph Pérez, 89, French historian and Hispanist.
- Tommy Robson, 76, English footballer (Northampton Town, Newcastle United, Peterborough United), motor neurone disease.
- Mohammad-Reza Shajarian, 80, Iranian classical singer, kidney cancer.
- Gene Shell, 90, American baseball coach (Tulsa Golden Hurricane, Southwestern Louisiana Ragin' Cajuns).
- Jimmie Lee Solomon, 64, American baseball executive.
- Greg Strobel, 68, American Hall of Fame college wrestler (Oregon State) and coach (Lehigh University), cancer.
- Jack Sutherland, 93, New Zealand athlete, British Empire Games bronze medallist (1950).
- Jan Szarek, 84, Polish Lutheran minister, Bishop of the Evangelical Church of the Augsburg Confession (1991–2001) and chairman of the Ecumenical Council (1993–2001), COVID-19.
- Gudrun Waadeland, 83, Norwegian actress.
- Erin Wall, 44, Canadian-American operatic soprano, complications from breast cancer.

=== 9 ===
- Bess Abell, 87, American political aide, complications from Alzheimer's disease.
- Arnold Ages, 85, Canadian-born American scholar.
- Teresita Aguilar, 87, Costa Rican politician, Deputy (2005–2006).
- David Refael ben-Ami, 70, Israeli singer, COVID-19.
- Frido Croes, 62, Aruban politician, Minister Plenipotentiary (2005–2009), member (1989–1994) and Chairman (2001–2004) of the Estates.
- Éric Danty, 72, French footballer (Stade de Reims, CS Meaux).
- Ruth Falcon, 77, American operatic soprano.
- Helmut Giesbrecht, 77, Ukrainian-born Canadian politician, British Columbia MLA (1991–2001) and mayor of Terrace, British Columbia (1981–1985).
- Ekow Hayford, 49, Ghanaian politician, MP (since 2016), shot.
- Pat Hooper, 68, Irish Olympic runner (1980).
- Pierre Kezdy, 58, American musician (Naked Raygun, Pegboy, Strike Under), cancer.
- M. Suresh Kumar, 47, Indian cricketer (Kerala, Railways), suicide by hanging.
- Dilys Price, 88, Welsh skydiver.
- Len Rossi, 91, American Hall of Fame professional wrestler (NWA Mid-America), cancer.
- Francine Simonin, 84, Swiss artist.
- Cecil Thiré, 77, Brazilian actor (The Guns, A Padroeira, Celebridade) and director, complications of Parkinson's disease.
- Kaylea Titford, 16, British child with spina bifida and hydrocephalus found dead in squalid conditions
- Vijay, 84, Indian film director (Gandhada Gudi, Mayura, Mojugara Sogasugara).

=== 10 ===
- John N. Berry, 87, American librarian, heart attack.
- Dyan Birch, 71, English singer (Arrival, Kokomo), chronic obstructive pulmonary disease.
- Lolly Borg, 88, Maltese football player and manager.
- Serge Bourdoncle, 84, French football player (Sochaux, Metz) and manager (Algrange).
- Chen Shaokun, 99, Chinese army officer and politician, deputy political commissar of Shenyang Military Region (1969–1975).
- Amnon Freidberg, 75, Israeli entomologist, COVID-19.
- Constantin Frosin, 67, Romanian-French writer.
- Martin Golding, 90, American philosopher.
- Suresh Gore, 55, Indian politician, Maharashtra MLA (2014–2019), COVID-19.
- Priscilla Jana, 76, South African lawyer and human rights activist.
- Muhammad Adil Khan, Pakistani Islamic scholar, shot.
- Vasili Kulkov, 54, Russian football player (Spartak Moscow, Benfica, national team) and manager, complications from cancer.
- Fabrice Nora, 69, French press executive.
- Stanley Schumacher, 87, Canadian politician, MP (1968–1979) and Alberta MLA (1986–1997).
- Dolores Cooper Shockley, 90, American pharmacologist.
- Yves Taschereau, 77, Canadian writer and journalist.
- Trần Văn Nhung, 86–87, Vietnamese footballer (South Vietnam national team).
- Hugo Tschirky, 82, Swiss scientist.
- Kent L. Wakeford, 92, American cinematographer (Mean Streets, Alice Doesn't Live Here Anymore, China O'Brien).
- Val Warner, 74, British poet.

=== 11 ===
- Hugo Arana, 77, Argentine actor (El Santo de la Espada, The Truce, Los exitosos Pells) and comedian, COVID-19.
- Thomas Atcitty, 87, American politician, President of the Navajo Nation (1998).
- Richie Barker, 80, English football player (Burton Albion, Notts County) and manager (Stoke City).
- Harold Betters, 92, American jazz trombonist.
- Louis Carter, 67, American football player (Oakland Raiders, Tampa Bay Buccaneers), blood cancer.
- Stelio Craveirinha, 70, Mozambican Olympic long jumper (1980).
- John J. Creedon, 96, American insurance executive, CEO of MetLife (1983–1989).
- Boro Drljača, 79, Serbian folk singer, colon cancer.
- William Frey, 90, American bishop.
- Gerald Gardner, 91, American television writer (The Monkees, Get Smart), cancer.
- Jon Gibson, 80, American minimalist musician (Philip Glass Ensemble).
- Joanna Harcourt-Smith, 74, Swiss-born socialite and writer, cancer.
- Mirza Mazharul Islam, 93, Bangladeshi surgeon and political activist.
- Gary F. Jones, 76, American Hall of Fame Thoroughbred racehorse trainer.
- Barbara Lewis King, 90, American religious leader.
- Zdeněk Košta, 97, Czech Olympic cyclist.
- Fernando Lopes, 55, Angolan Olympic swimmer (1980).
- Wayne Mallory, 95, American actor.
- Ângelo Martins, 90, Portuguese footballer (Benfica, national team).
- Terry McBrayer, 83, American politician, member of the Kentucky House of Representatives (1966–1976), cancer.
- Ilya Moiseev, 91, Russian chemist.
- Joe Morgan, 77, American Hall of Fame baseball player (Cincinnati Reds, Houston Astros, San Francisco Giants) and broadcaster, NL MVP and World Series champion (1975, 1976).
- Michael D. Morley, 90, American mathematician.
- Donald Pellmann, 105, American masters athlete, complications from a broken hip.
- Jay Porter, 87, American baseball player (Detroit Tigers, Cleveland Indians, St. Louis Cardinals).
- Rajan, 87, Indian musician and composer.
- John A. Ruthven, 95, American wildlife artist.
- Robert Scott, 89, American baseball player (New York Black Yankees).

=== 12 ===
- Kęstutis Antanėlis, 69, Lithuanian composer, architect and sculptor.
- Éric Assous, 64, Tunisian-born French film director, screenwriter (The Banned Woman, The Girl from Paris, 22 Bullets) and dramatist.
- Jacinda Barclay, 29, Australian footballer (Greater Western Sydney) and baseball player (national team), suicide.
- Sir Samuel Brittan, 86, British journalist and author.
- Leo Brereton, 83, Australian footballer (Carlton).
- Aldo Brovarone, 94, Italian automobile designer (Dino 206 GT and 246 GT).
- Menelaos Chatzigeorgiou, 95, Greek politician, MEP (1990–1994).
- C. M. Chang, 78, Indian politician, MP (2009–2014) and Nagaland MLA (since 2013), complications from typhoid fever and COVID-19.
- Carlton Chapman, 49, Indian football player (East Bengal, national team) and manager (Wahingdoh), heart attack.
- Gerty Christoffels, 62, Belgian television presenter, cancer.
- Bernard S. Cohen, 76, American attorney (Loving v. Virginia), complications from Parkinson's disease.
- Cecil Cousley, 88, Northern Irish politician.
- José de Oliveira Fernandes, 76, Brazilian politician and economist, mayor of Manaus (1979–1982), complications from COVID-19.
- Conchata Ferrell, 77, American actress (Two and a Half Men, Edward Scissorhands, Network), complications from cardiac arrest.
- Nevzat Güzelırmak, 78, Turkish football player (Göztepe, national team) and manager (Denizlispor).
- Susan Hendl, 73, American ballet dancer (New York City Ballet) and répétiteur, renal failure.
- Abai Ikwechegh, 97, Nigerian jurist.
- Robert Jammes, 93, French linguist.
- Sarat Kumar Kar, 81, Indian politician, MP (1977–1980), member (1971–1974, 1990–1995, 2000–2004) and speaker (2000–2004) of the Odisha Legislative Assembly, COVID-19.
- Yehoshua Kenaz, 83, Israeli writer, COVID-19.
- Vuyokazi Mahlati, South African social entrepreneur.
- Kannavara Mallappa, 92, Indian politician, Karnataka MLA (1985–1989) and MLC (1998–2002).
- Kim Massie, 63, American blues singer.
- Roberta McCain, 108, American socialite.
- Ameurfina Melencio-Herrera, 98, Filipino judge, Associate Justice of the Supreme Court (1979–1992).
- Eduardus Nabunome, 52, Indonesian Olympic runner (1988).
- Ion Predescu, 93, Romanian politician and magistrate, Senator (1990–2004) and judge of the Constitutional Court (2004–2013).
- Carlos M. Rivera, 86, American firefighter, FDNY Commissioner (1990–1993).
- Ezra Schabas, 96, American-Canadian musician, educator, and author.
- Sadegh Malek Shahmirzadi, 80, Iranian archaeologist and anthropologist.
- Litokwa Tomeing, 80, Marshallese politician, President (2008–2009)

=== 13 ===
- Steve Adubato Sr., 87, American politician and educator.
- Dean Bandiera, 94, Canadian football player (Winnipeg Blue Bombers).
- Jean Cardot, 90, French sculptor, president of the Académie des Beaux-Arts (1992, 1997).
- J. P. Clark, 85, Nigerian poet.
- Claude Feidt, 84, French Roman Catholic prelate, Archbishop of Chambéry (1985–1999) and Aix (1999–2010).
- Raimundo García, 84, Argentine chess master.
- Rashid Haider, 79, Bangladeshi author and novelist.
- Anthony Hill, 90, British constructionist artist.
- Marcel Zadi Kessy, 84, Ivorian politician.
- Chris Killip, 74, Manx photographer, lung cancer.
- Ab Krook, 76, Dutch speed skating coach, cerebral infarction.
- Marisa de Leza, 87, Spanish actress (I'm Not Mata Hari, Under the Sky of Spain, Allow Me, Daddy!).
- László Mandur, 62, Hungarian politician, MP (2002–2013) and Deputy Speaker (2002–2010).
- Augusto Matine, 73, Mozambican-born Portuguese football player (Benfica, Vitória Setúbal, national team) and manager.
- Edward C. Meyer, 91, American military officer, Army Chief of Staff (1979–1983), pneumonia.
- Nguyễn Văn Man, 54, Vietnamese military officer, landslide.
- Saint Dog, 44, American rapper (Kottonmouth Kings).
- Jean Schalit, 83, French journalist.
- Percy Schmeiser, 89, Canadian farm equipment executive, farmer, and politician, Saskatchewan MLA (1967–1971), Parkinson's disease.
- Karl Schütz, 84, Austrian organist.
- Veaceslav Semionov, 64, Moldovan football player and manager (Dacia Chișinău).
- Joe Washington, 69, American football player (Atlanta Falcons).
- Elizabeth Wolgast, 91, American philosopher, complications from a stroke.

=== 14 ===
- Ron Best, 71, Australian politician, Victorian MLC (1988–2002), pancreatic cancer.
- Jennings Bryant, 76, American communication scholar.
- William Keir Carr, 97, Canadian military officer, Commander of the Royal Canadian Air Force (1975–1978).
- Lance Carson, 74, American politician, member of the South Dakota House of Representatives (2007–2015, 2017–2019), COVID-19.
- John Coles, 90, Canadian–British archaeologist and historian.
- Fred Dean, 68, American Hall of Fame football player (San Diego Chargers, San Francisco 49ers), COVID-19.
- Rhonda Fleming, 97, American actress (Spellbound, Serpent of the Nile, The Buster Keaton Story), aspiration pneumonia.
- David Geiser, 73, American painter and cartoonist, heart disease.
- Armando Herrera, 84, Mexican Olympic basketball player (1960, 1964).
- Sir James Jungius, 96, British vice admiral, Deputy Supreme Allied Commander Atlantic (1975–1977).
- Herbert Kretzmer, 95, South African-born English journalist and lyricist (Les Misérables).
- Paul Matters, 68, Australian rock bassist (AC/DC), heart disease.
- Jack McLeod, 94, Australian footballer (Hawthorn).
- Shobha Naidu, 64, Indian Kuchipudi dancer.
- Kuniwo Nakamura, 76, Palauan politician, President (1993–2001) and Vice President (1989–1993).
- José Augusto Martins Fernandes Pedreira, 85, Portuguese Roman Catholic prelate, Bishop of Viana do Castelo (1997–2010).
- John Richard Reid, 92, New Zealand cricketer (Otago, Wellington, national team).
- Ken Rice, 81, American football player (Buffalo Bills, Oakland Raiders, Miami Dolphins).
- Audrey Smedley, 89, American social anthropologist.
- Joyce Wallace, 79, American physician.
- Dame Rachel Waterhouse, 97, British historian.
- Mahmoud Yassin, 79, Egyptian actor.

=== 15 ===
- Antonio Ángel Algora Hernando, 80, Spanish Roman Catholic prelate, Bishop of Teruel and Albarracín (1985–2003) and Ciudad Real (2003–2016), complications from COVID-19.
- Glen Amerson, 81, American football player (Philadelphia Eagles).
- Roy Andrewartha, 82, English snooker player.
- Bhanu Athaiya, 91, Indian costume designer (Gandhi, Lekin..., Lagaan), Oscar winner (1983), complications from brain cancer.
- Joan Barnett, 74, American television producer (The Jayne Mansfield Story, The Parent Trap II, Long Gone).
- Karsten Beck, 33, German professional wrestler (wXw), brain cancer.
- Ed Benguiat, 92, American typographer and visual artist.
- Kishore Bhimani, 81, Indian sports journalist.
- Sonja Edström, 89, Swedish cross-country skier, Olympic champion (1960) and bronze medalist (1956).
- William W. Hartzog, 79, American general.
- Gordon Haskell, 74, English singer-songwriter ("How Wonderful You Are") and musician (King Crimson, The Fleur de Lys), lung cancer.
- Arnannguaq Høegh, 63, Greenlandic artist.
- Dave Hull, 86, American radio personality (KRLA).
- Terry Kearns, 75, Irish Gaelic footballer (Meath).
- Danil Khalimov, 42, Russian-Kazakh Olympic wrestler (2004), COVID-19.
- Tom Maschler, 87, British publisher, co-founder of the Booker Prize.
- Mauricio Mata, 81, Mexican Olympic cyclist (1960).
- Warren Mitchell, 87, American college basketball coach (William & Mary Tribe), complications of dementia and COVID-19.
- John P. Moon, 82, American business executive (Apple Inc.).
- Yakubu Moro, Ghanaian football executive, founder of Berekum Arsenal, stroke.
- Akkitham Achuthan Namboothiri, 94, Indian poet.
- Fambaré Ouattara Natchaba, 75, Togolese politician, President of the National Assembly (2000–2005), Minister of Foreign Affairs (1992–1994) and MP (1994–2005).
- Sonya O. Rose, 84, American historian and sociologist.
- Renato Sacchi, 91, Italian Olympic sport shooter.
- Sultan Saif, 27, Emirati footballer (Al Wadha, Baniyas, Al-Ittihad Kalba), traffic collision.
- Jole Santelli, 51, Italian politician, Deputy (2001–2020) and President of Calabria (since 2020), cardiac arrest.
- Tsering Tashi, 69, Indian politician, Arunachal Pradesh MLA, cancer.
- Alfons Verplaetse, 90, Belgian economist, Governor of the National Bank of Belgium (1989–1999), COVID-19.
- P. Vetrivel, 60, Indian politician, Tamil Nadu MLA (2011–2016), septic shock from COVID-19.
- Paul Weinberg, 74, American pediatric cardiologist.

=== 16 ===
- Ed Apple, 87, American politician.
- Sir Roy Beldam, 95, British judge, Lord Justice of Appeal (1989–2000).
- Jean Bonhomme, 96, French politician, Member of the French National Assembly (1968–1981, 1986–1988).
- László Branikovits, 70, Hungarian footballer, Olympic silver medalist (1972).
- John Edwin Britton, 96, Canadian politician.
- Anula Bulathsinhala, 73, Sri Lankan actress (Mahindagamanaya, Asandhimitta, Goal).
- Johnny Bush, 85, American country singer-songwriter ("Whiskey River").
- Anthony Chisholm, 77, American actor (Radio Golf, Gem of the Ocean, Oz).
- Markar Esayan, 51, Turkish journalist (Yeni Şafak, Agos) and politician, MP (since 2015), stomach cancer.
- Rodolfo Fischer, 76, Argentine footballer (San Lorenzo, Once Caldas, national team).
- Odore Joseph Gendron, 99, American Roman Catholic prelate, Bishop of Manchester (1975–1990).
- Gennadios, 83, Greek-Italian Eastern Orthodox prelate, Archbishop of Italy and Malta (since 1996).
- Alan G. Gross, 84, American academic.
- John Henderson, 107, American college football player (Texas Longhorns).
- Jim Huggard, 87, American basketball player and coach.
- Itzhak Ilan, 64, Israeli security official, deputy director of Shin Bet (2010–2011), COVID-19.
- Wayne Johnson, 78, American politician, member of the Wyoming Senate (2005–2017) and the House of Representatives (1993–2005).
- Kapil Deo Kamat, 69, Indian politician, Bihar MLA (2005–2010, since 2015), COVID-19.
- Jack McMahan, 88, American baseball player (Pittsburgh Pirates, Kansas City Athletics).
- P. S. Narayanaswamy, 86, Indian singer.
- Joaquín Pardo, 74, Colombian Olympic footballer (1968).
- Samuel Paty, 47, French teacher, beheaded.
- Andrzej Pogorzelski, 82, Polish motorcycle speedway rider and coach.
- John Powley, 84, British politician, MP (1983–1987).
- Landon Rabern, 39, American mathematician and computer scientist.
- James Redford, 58, American filmmaker and activist, bile duct cancer.
- Ana Paula Scheffer, 31, Brazilian rhythmic gymnast, heart attack.
- Abdul Aziz Shamsuddin, 82, Malaysian politician, MP (2004–2008).
- Gholam-Abbas Tavassoli, 85, Iranian sociologist, cardiac arrest.
- Dave Toole, 56, British dancer.
- Marjatta Väänänen, 97, Finnish politician, Minister of Culture (1972–1975), Education (1976–1977) and Social Affairs and Health (1982–1983), MP (1975–1991).

=== 17 ===
- Frederick Azzopardi, 71, Maltese politician, MP (since 1998).
- Erland Brand, 98, Swedish painter.
- Al Carapella, 93, American football player (San Francisco 49ers).
- Aurora Chamorro, 66, Spanish Olympic swimmer (1972).
- Lucien De Brauwere, 69, Belgian Olympic cyclist (1972).
- Hiram Drache, 96, American historian.
- Antoine Dumas, 87, Canadian painter.
- Paula Girven, 62, American Olympic high jumper (1976), cancer.
- Yusop Jikiri, 66, Filipino politician, Governor of Sulu (2001–2004).
- Toshinori Kondo, 71, Japanese jazz trumpeter.
- Doreen Montalvo, 56, American actress, singer and playwright (In the Heights).
- Bonaria Manca, 95, Italian painter.
- Sir John Margetson, 93, British diplomat, Ambassador to Vietnam (1978–1980) and the Netherlands (1984–1988), Gentleman Usher of the Blue Rod (1992–2002).
- Glen Michaels, 93, American sculptor and painter.
- Henri Noël, 83, French football player and manager (Nîmes B).
- Pollycarpus Priyanto, 59, Indonesian convicted murderer and pilot, COVID-19.
- Ryszard Ronczewski, 90, Polish actor (The Two Who Stole the Moon, Colonel Wolodyjowski, An Ancient Tale: When the Sun Was a God), COVID-19.
- Takna Jigme Sangpo, 94, Tibetan political prisoner.
- Michael Strauss, 86, Israeli industrialist.
- Bob Weber, 86, American cartoonist (Moose & Molly).
- Zhang Lina, 80, Chinese physical chemist.

=== 18 ===
- Laleh Bakhtiar, 82, Iranian-American author, translator, and psychologist, leukemia.
- Alan S. Boyd, 98, American attorney, Secretary of Transportation (1967–1969).
- Alan Bradshaw, 79, English footballer (Crewe Alexandra, Blackburn Rovers, Macclesfield Town).
- Robert Coleman, 97, American geologist.
- Bekir Coşkun, 75, Turkish journalist (Hürriyet, Cumhuriyet), lung cancer.
- Agostino Giuseppe Delfino, 85, Italian Roman Catholic prelate, Bishop of Berbérati (1991–2010).
- René Felber, 87, Swiss politician, President (1992) and member of the Federal Council (1987–1993).
- Sally Flint, 89, American politician.
- François-Yves Guillin, 99, French resistant, doctor, and historian.
- Sid Hartman, 100, American sports journalist (Star Tribune) and broadcaster (WCCO, WUCW).
- Tomás Herrera Martínez, 69, Cuban basketball player, Olympic bronze medallist (1972).
- James A. Johnson, 76, American political consultant and financier, CEO of Fannie Mae (1991–1998), complications from a neurological condition.
- Stanisław Kogut, 66, Polish politician and trade union activist, Senator (2005–2019), COVID-19.
- David Kushnir, 89, Israeli Olympic long jumper (1956, 1960), footballer (Hapoel Balfouria), and athletics coach.
- Joseph Mar Thoma, 89, Indian Mar Thoma Syrian prelate, Metropolitan of the Church (since 2007), pancreatic cancer.
- Jose Melo, 88, Filipino jurist, Associate Justice of the Supreme Court (1992–2002) and Chairman of the COMELEC (2008–2011).
- Ricardo Montserrat, 66, French author and writer.
- Naâma, 84, Tunisian singer.
- José Padilla, 64, Spanish DJ (Café del Mar) and producer, colon cancer.
- Jean-Christophe Parisot, 53, French political scientist.
- Gerry Quinn, 80, Irish Gaelic footballer.
- Vijayalakshmi Ramanan, 96, Indian Air Force officer.
- Arvin Reingold, 90, American attorney and politician, member of the Tennessee House of Representatives (1963–1965).
- Gérard Sulon, 82, Belgian footballer (RFC Liège, Beerschot VAC, national team).
- Eddie Tonks, 85, New Zealand sports administrator, chairman of the New Zealand Rugby Football Union (1990–1995).
- Jill Paton Walsh, 83, English novelist (Knowledge of Angels, A Presumption of Death, The Attenbury Emeralds).
- Chet "JR" White, 40, American bassist (Girls) and record producer.
- Aldo Zargani, 87, Italian writer and Holocaust survivor.

=== 19 ===
- Ahmed Adghirni, 73, Moroccan lawyer, politician, and human rights activist.
- Jana Andresíková, 79, Czech actress (The Young Man and Moby Dick, Giorgino), COVID-19.
- Walter Bardgett, 88, Bermudan Olympic swimmer (1948, 1956).
- Marylin Bender, 95, American journalist and author.
- George H. V. Cecil, 95, American businessman, owner and chairman of Biltmore Farms.
- Mohinder Pratap Chand, 85, Indian writer and poet.
- Derryl Cousins, 74, American baseball umpire (Major League Baseball), cancer.
- Val Curtis, 62, British scientist, vaginal cancer.
- Spencer Davis, 81, Welsh singer and guitarist (The Spencer Davis Group), pneumonia.
- Gianni Dei, 79, Italian actor (Pronto... c'è una certa Giuliana per te, The Killers Are Our Guests, Patrick Still Lives) and singer.
- Luigi Franza, 81, Italian politician and lawyer.
- P. Gopikumar, 77, Indian film director (Ashtamangalyam, Harshabashpam, Pichipoo).
- Chris Isaac, 61, American-born Canadian football player (Ottawa Rough Riders), cancer.
- Järvsöfaks, 26, Swedish racehorse.
- Hiroh Kikai, 75, Japanese photographer, lymphoma.
- Mike Le Mare, 81, American sound engineer (Das Boot, The Terminator, Ronin).
- Tony Lewis, 62, English bassist, singer and songwriter (The Outfield).
- Enzo Mari, 88, Italian designer, COVID-19.
- Joan Mesquida, 57, Spanish politician, Deputy (2019) and Director-General of the Spanish National Police and Civil Guard (2006–2008), cancer.
- Merritt Norvell, 79, American college athletics administrator.
- Wojciech Pszoniak, 78, Polish actor (The Devil, The Tin Drum, Austeria).
- Iqbal F. Qadir, Pakistani military officer and diplomat, Vice Chief of Naval Staff (1980–1983) and Ambassador to Iran (1983–1985).
- Louise Renaud, 98, Canadian painter and dancer (Les Automatistes).
- Giovanni Spinola, 85, Italian Olympic rower.
- Theodosius, 86, American Eastern Orthodox prelate, Primate of the Church in America (1977–2002).
- Jim Townsend, 75, Scottish football player (Middlesbrough, Heart of Midlothian) and manager (Windsor Wheels).
- Alex Varenne, 81, French comic book artist and writer.

=== 20 ===
- Mary Beaudry, 69, American anthropologist, complications from a heart condition.
- René Billon, 89, French footballer (Stade Rennais).
- Yehoshua Blau, 101, Romanian-born Israeli literary scholar.
- Xavier Boulanger, 57–58, French actor (For Ever Mozart, Tous les soleils).
- John Condrone, 59, American professional wrestler (WCW) and singer-songwriter, COVID-19.
- Aubert Y. Coran, 88, American scientist.
- Lawrence E. Corbett Jr., 99, American politician.
- David Cunningham, 92, Australian Olympic ice hockey player (1960).
- Deanna Demuzio, 77, American politician, member of the Illinois Senate (2004–2011), mayor of Carlinville (since 2013).
- Hal Dues, 66, American baseball player (Montreal Expos).
- Dariusz Gnatowski, 59, Polish actor (Demons of War, With Fire and Sword), COVID-19.
- Tom La Farge, 73, American writer, cancer.
- Salvio Lemos, 87, Brazilian Olympic modern pentathlete.
- Stuart Mackenzie, 83, Australian rower.
- Bruno Martini, 58, French footballer (Auxerre, Montpellier, national team), cardiac arrest.
- Bill Mathis, 81, American football player (New York Jets).
- Yuri Mochanov, 85, Russian archaeologist.
- Paul Murphy, 77, Australian journalist, cancer.
- Ron Murphy, 88, Canadian football player (Montreal Alouettes, Hamilton Tiger Cats).
- David Murray, 95, British Olympic water polo player.
- Vladimir Osipov, 82, Russian writer.
- James Randi, 92, Canadian-American magician and skeptic, founder of the JREF and co-founder of the CSI.
- Irina Skobtseva, 93, Russian actress (War and Peace, Othello, Walking the Streets of Moscow), People's Artist of the RSFSR (1974).
- Pio Tabaiwalu, 60, Fijian politician, founder of SODELPA.
- Carl E. Thoresen, 87, American psychologist.
- Lea Vergine, 84, Italian art critic and curator, COVID-19.
- Bogdan Józef Wojtuś, 83, Polish Roman Catholic prelate, auxiliary bishop of Gniezno (1988–2012), COVID-19.

=== 21 ===
- Jesse Arnelle, 86, American basketball player (Fort Wayne Pistons) and lawyer, heart disease.
- Gordon Astall, 93, English footballer (Birmingham City, national team).
- Zero Babu, 80, Indian playback singer (Kudumbini) and actor (Maadatharuvi, Kabooliwala).
- M. Bhaskaran, 80, Indian politician, mayor of Kozhikode (2005–2010).
- Marge Champion, 101, American actress (Show Boat, Give a Girl a Break), choreographer and model (Snow White and the Seven Dwarfs), Emmy winner (1975).
- Tim Ealey, 93, Australian biologist.
- John Edwin Field, 84, British experimental physicist.
- Mario Henderson, 35, American football player (Oakland Raiders, San Diego Chargers).
- Frank Horvat, 92, Croatian-French photographer.
- James G. Jones, 86, American major general.
- Albert R. Jonsen, 89, American bioethicist, President of University of San Francisco (1969–1972).
- Pierre Jourdan, 97, French politician, Senator (1971–1980), mayor of Saint-Étienne-de-Lugdarès (1959–1980).
- Jackson L. Kiser, 91, American jurist, Judge (since 1981) and Chief Judge (1993–1997) of the U.S. District Court for Western Virginia.
- J. Michael Lane, 84, American epidemiologist.
- Paul Leduc, 78, Mexican film director (Frida Still Life, Reed: Insurgent Mexico).
- Janice Niemi, 92, American politician, member of the Washington House of Representatives (1983–1987) and Washington State Senate (1987–1995).
- Arolde de Oliveira, 81, Brazilian politician, Deputy (1984–2019) and Senator (since 2019), complications from COVID-19.
- Peter Secchia, 83, American building material executive and diplomat, Ambassador to Italy and San Marino (1989–1993), CEO of Universal Forest Products, COVID-19.
- David Scondras, 74, American politician (Boston City Council).
- Viola Smith, 107, American drummer, complications from Alzheimer's disease.
- Manfred Steiner, 70, Austrian football player (Sturm Graz, national team) and manager.
- Nurham O. Warwick, 80, American politician.
- Roy Wisbey, 91, British medievalist.
- Tom Yewcic, 88, American football player (Boston Patriots).

=== 22 ===
- Rudy Ballieux, 90, Dutch immunologist.
- Sara Barber, 79, Canadian Olympic swimmer.
- Giorgio Bernini, 91, Italian politician, Deputy (1994–1996).
- Matt Blair, 70, American football player (Minnesota Vikings), dementia.
- William Blinn, 83, American television producer (Starsky & Hutch) and screenwriter (Brian's Song, Purple Rain), Emmy winner (1972, 1977).
- Frank Bough, 87, English television presenter (Grandstand, Nationwide, Breakfast Time).
- Margie Bowes, 79, American country music singer (Grand Ole Opry).
- Richard W. Burgin, 73, American writer and composer.
- Joel Daly, 86, American news anchor (WLS-TV).
- K. Deep, 79, Indian singer and comedian.
- Richard C. Dorf, 86, American engineer.
- Dave Gerlach, 80, Canadian curler.
- Stephen Gray, 78, South African writer (Time of Our Darkness).
- Shukur Hamidov, 45, Azerbaijani military officer and national hero, shot.
- Guy Hernandez, 92, French Olympic diver (1948).
- Chris Huggett, British engineer, co-founder of Electronic Dream Plant.
- David Keith, 46, American racing driver.
- Frank Legacki, 81, American swimmer, prostate cancer.
- Richard A. Lupoff, 85, American author (Space War Blues, Master of Adventure, Lovecraft's Book).
- Allan Migi, 59–60, Papua New Guinean Anglican prelate, primate and archbishop of the Anglican Church of Papua New Guinea (2017–2020).
- Adam Morton, 75, Canadian philosopher, assisted suicide.
- Nayani Narasimha Reddy, 86, Indian politician, Telangana MLA (since 2004), post-COVID-19 complications.
- Pierre Oster, 87, French poet and editor.
- Ben Reiges, 100, American football player and coach.

=== 23 ===
- Marcus Banks, 60, English visual anthropologist, complications from epilepsy.
- Yehuda Barkan, 75, Israeli film producer, actor (Escape to the Sun, Yellow Peppers) and screenwriter, COVID-19.
- David Barnes, 62, New Zealand sailor (KZ1), 470 world champion (1981, 1983, 1984).
- Jean-Claude Baulu, 84, French footballer (Valenciennes FC, AS Saint-Étienne).
- W. C. Gorden, 90, American Hall of Fame college football player (Tennessee State) and coach (Jackson State).
- Gabriel Guarda, 92, Chilean architect and historian.
- Serguei Katchiourine, 47, Kyrgyzstani Olympic fencer.
- Kid Lucky, 48, American beatboxer, pioneer of beatrhyming, and actor.
- Ming Cho Lee, 90, Chinese-American Hall of Fame theatrical set designer.
- Frits Niessen, 84, Dutch politician, member of the House of Representatives (1977–1978, 1980–1994).
- Abderrahmane Rahmouni, 75, Tunisian footballer (Club Africain).
- John Rushing, 48, American football coach (Utah State, Green Bay Packers, Los Angeles Rams).
- Nick Salazar, 91, American politician, member of the New Mexico House of Representatives (1974–2019).
- Ebbe Skovdahl, 75, Danish football player and manager (Brøndby, Benfica, Aberdeen).
- Barry Tait, 82, English footballer (York City).
- Tor Torgersen, 92, Norwegian Olympic runner (1960).
- R. M. Vaughan, 55, Canadian writer. (body discovered on this date)
- Jerry Jeff Walker, 78, American singer-songwriter ("Mr. Bojangles"), throat cancer.
- Bob Whitlow, 84, American football player (Detroit Lions, Washington Redskins, Atlanta Falcons).

=== 24 ===
- Jacques Bellenger, 92, French Olympic sprint cyclist (1948).
- Gordon Brown, 62, German sculptor.
- Maurice Bodson, 76, Belgian politician, Member of the Parliament of Wallonia (1995–2009).
- Prince Azim of Brunei, 38, Bruneian royal and film producer (You're Not You).
- Chung So-sung, 76, South Korean writer.
- Ludwik Flaszen, 90, Polish theatre director and writer.
- Rafique Ul Huq, 84, Bangladeshi lawyer, Attorney General (1990–1991).
- Nzamba Kitonga, 64, Kenyan lawyer and politician.
- Jean Matouk, 83, French economist and politician, COVID-19.
- Abu Muhsin al-Masri, 62, Egyptian Islamic militant (al-Qaeda in the Indian Subcontinent), shot.
- Kevin McCarra, 62, Scottish sports journalist (The Guardian, Scotland on Sunday, The Times), complications from Alzheimer's disease.
- Abbas Moayeri, 81, Iranian-born French sculptor and painter.
- Joel Molina Ramírez, 77, Mexican politician, Senator (since 2019), COVID-19.
- Stephen Owusu, 37, Ghanaian footballer (Heart of Lions, Aduana Stars, national team).
- Jean-Claude Pasche, 80, Swiss theatre director.
- Betty Ida Roots, 93, British-born Canadian zoologist.
- Bobby Smith, 83, American basketball player (Minneapolis/Los Angeles Lakers).
- Gerald Stromer, 77, American politician.
- Pavel Syrchin, 62, Soviet heavyweight weightlifter, complications from COVID-19.
- Krisztián Veréb, 43, Hungarian sprint canoer, Olympic bronze medallist (2000), traffic collision.
- Fred Ulysse, 86, French actor (Raging Fists, Moon in the Gutter).
- Paul Zingtung Grawng, 82, Burmese Roman Catholic prelate, Archbishop of Mandalay (2003–2014) and Bishop of Myitkyina (1976–2003).

=== 25 ===
- Masatoshi Abe, 77, Japanese politician, MP (1995–2007).
- Dolores Abril, 85, Spanish singer and actress (El emigrante).
- Jan Boerman, 97, Dutch electronic music composer.
- Rosanna Carteri, 89, Italian operatic soprano.
- David Mark Chalmers, 93, American historian.
- Ernesto Contreras, 83, Argentine Olympic cyclist (1960, 1964, 1968), heart attack.
- Diane di Prima, 86, American Beat poet.
- Izzat Ibrahim al-Douri, 78, Iraqi military officer and politician, Vice President (1979–2003).
- John Duncanson, 80, Scottish broadcaster (North Tonight).
- György Fischer, 85, Hungarian pianist and conductor.
- Fritz Gallati, 85, Swiss racing cyclist.
- Abderrazak Afilal Alami Idrissi, 96–97, Moroccan economist and politician, MP (1977–1983).
- Mahesh Kanodia, 83, Indian singer and politician, MP (1991–2009).
- David Karnes, 71, American politician, member of the U.S. Senate (1987–1989), cancer.
- Lee Kun-hee, 78, South Korean electronics executive, chairman of the Samsung Group (1987–2008, since 2010).
- Johnny Leeze, 78, English actor (Emmerdale, Coronation Street, The League of Gentlemen), COVID-19.
- Slaven Letica, 73, Croatian author, economist and politician.
- Robert E. Murray, 80, American mining engineer, founder of Murray Energy, complications from pulmonary fibrosis.
- Thomas Oppermann, 66, German politician, member (since 2005) and Vice President (since 2017) of the Bundestag.
- Goro Shibutani, 83, Japanese table tennis player.
- Kazimierz Wardak, 73, Polish runner.

=== 26 ===
- Chris Abell, 62, British biological chemist.
- Richard Adjei, 37, German bobsledder, Olympic silver medallist (2010) and American football player (Rhein Fire, Berlin Thunder), heart attack.
- Theophilus Adeleke Akinyele, 88, Nigerian civil servant.
- Jean-Pierre Autheman, 73, French comic book author.
- Tadeusz Balcerowski, 87, Polish politician and cooperative activist, member of Sejm (2004–2005).
- David Braley, 79, Canadian politician and sports team owner (BC Lions, Toronto Argonauts, Hamilton Tiger-Cats), Senator (2010–2013).
- Janine Canan, 77, American poet and author.
- Peter Cardew, 81, British-Canadian architect.
- Pedro Cervantes, 87, Mexican sculptor, heart attack.
- Osman Durmuş, 73, Turkish politician, Minister of Health (1999–2002) and MP (1999–2002, 2007–2011), cerebral hemorrhage.
- Glenn Florio, 53, American Olympic rower (1988).
- Jacques Godin, 90, Canadian actor (O.K. ... Laliberté, The Pyx, Being at Home with Claude) and comedian, heart failure.
- David Gracie, 93, British Olympic hurdler (1952).
- Lindy Hamilton-Temple-Blackwood, Marchioness of Dufferin and Ava, 79, British art patron and conservationist.
- Marcel Hendrickx, 85, Belgian politician, member of the Belgian Chamber of Representatives (1999–2003).
- Paul-Jean Hérault, 86, French writer and journalist, stroke.
- Jim Iverson, 90, American basketball player and coach (South Dakota State Jackrabbits).
- Robert H. Johns, 77, American meteorologist.
- Eddie Johnson, 65, American basketball player (Atlanta Hawks).
- James Kennedy, 71, Scottish cricketer (Scotland).
- Stan Kesler, 92, American musician, songwriter ("I'm Left, You're Right, She's Gone", "I Forgot to Remember to Forget") and producer, bone cancer.
- Peter Lavery, 83, Northern Irish boxer.
- Albert Medwin, 94, American electrical engineer.
- Daniel Menaker, 79, American writer and editor, pancreatic cancer.
- Joey Moss, 57, Canadian dressing room attendant (Edmonton Oilers, Edmonton Eskimos).
- Juan R. Torruella, 87, Puerto Rican Olympic sailor (1964, 1968, 1972, 1976) and jurist, Judge (since 1984) and Chief Judge (1994–2001) of the U.S. Court of Appeals for the First Circuit.

=== 27 ===
- Michael Aukett, 82, British architect.
- Shaban Bantariza, 56–57, Ugandan colonel, COVID-19.
- Nancy DeMarinis, 90, American politician.
- Gao Fengwen, 80, Chinese football player (Liaoning Hongyun, national team) and manager.
- William Fleece, 85, American politician.
- Jean-Jacques Grand-Jouan, 71, French actor and director.
- Andrzej Iwiński, 74, Polish Olympic sailor (1968, 1980), and entrepreneur.
- Naresh Kanodia, 77, Indian actor, singer, and politician, Gujarat MLA (2002–2007), COVID-19.
- Rewati Raman Khanal, 88, Nepalese author, complications from asthma and diabetes.
- Philip R. Lee, 96, American physician.
- Bob Lochmueller, 93, American basketball player (Syracuse Nationals).
- Jan Martinette, 82, American politician.
- Don Mazankowski, 85, Canadian politician, Deputy Prime Minister (1986–1993), Minister of Finance (1991–1993) and MP (1968–1993).
- Don Morrow, 93, American presenter (Camouflage) and announcer (Sale of the Century).
- Y. Nagappa, 75, Indian politician.
- Jan Niemiec, 62, Polish-born Ukrainian Roman Catholic prelate, auxiliary bishop of Kamyanets-Podilskyi (since 2006), COVID-19.
- Serge Noël, 64, Belgian poet.
- Julia O'Faolain, 88, Irish writer.
- Jimmy Orr, 85, American football player (Baltimore Colts, Pittsburgh Steelers), Super Bowl champion (1971).
- Tatsuhiro Ōshiro, 95, Japanese novelist and playwright.
- Gilberto Penayo, 87, Paraguayan footballer (Sol de América, Cerro Porteño, national team).
- Paul Rambié, 101, French painter.
- Alan Rayment, 92, English cricketer (Hampshire).
- Bruce Reid, 74, Australian medical doctor (Essendon) and footballer (Hawthorn), cancer.
- Rolf Stumpf, 74, South African statistician, vice chancellor of Nelson Mandela University (since 2002).
- Andrea Tabanelli, 59, Italian Paralympic wheelchair curler (2006, 2010).
- Ryszard Witke, 80, Polish Olympic ski jumper (1964, 1968).

=== 28 ===
- Trevor Adair, 59, American college soccer coach (Clemson Tigers, Brown Bears).
- Hubert Astier, 82, French public official and politician, President of the Public Establishment of the Palace, Museum and National Estate of Versailles (1995–2003).
- Bobby Ball, 76, English comedian (Cannon and Ball), actor (Mount Pleasant, Not Going Out) and television host, complications from COVID-19.
- Fay Biles, 93, American academic.
- Ray Blacklock, 65, Australian rugby league player (Penrith, Newtown, Canberra), multiple system atrophy.
- Giorgio Carta, 82, Italian politician, Deputy (1992–1994, 2006–2008).
- Miguel Ángel Castellini, 73, Argentine boxer, WBA Light Middleweight champion (1976–1977), COVID-19.
- Pericles Cavalcanti, 94, Brazilian Olympic equestrian.
- Cecilia Chiang, 100, Chinese-American restaurateur.
- Leanza Cornett, 49, American television personality, Miss America (1993), injuries sustained in a fall.
- Chuck Crist, 69, American football player (New Orleans Saints, New York Giants).
- Miomir Dašić, 89, Montenegrin historian.
- Hassan Zare Dehnavi, 64, Iranian judge and prosecutor, COVID-19.
- Gurgen Egiazaryan, 72, Armenian politician, COVID-19.
- Cano Estremera, 62, Puerto Rican salsa singer.
- Anatoliy Fedorchuk, 60, Ukrainian politician, COVID-19.
- Anthony Soter Fernandez, 88, Malaysian Roman Catholic cardinal, Bishop of Penang (1977–1983) and Archbishop of Kuala Lumpur (1983–2003), cancer.
- Stanisław Gazda, 82, Polish Olympic racing cyclist (1960).
- Heidi Hassenmüller, 78–79, German journalist and children's writer.
- Leo Hebert, 89, Canadian curler.
- David Katzeek, 77, American Tlingit language educator.
- Jan Krawiec, 101, Polish-American journalist, COVID-19.
- Mohamed Melehi, 83, Moroccan painter, COVID-19.
- Hugh Morrow, 90, Northern Irish football player (West Bromwich Albion, Northampton Town) and manager (Tamworth).
- Joseph Moureau, 99, Belgian fighter pilot.
- Alain Rey, 92, French linguist and lexicographer, editor-in-chief of Dictionnaires Le Robert (since 1967).
- Pino Scaccia, 74, Italian journalist and blogger, COVID-19.
- Štefan Sečka, 67, Slovak Roman Catholic prelate, auxiliary bishop (2002–2011) and Bishop of Spiš (since 2011), cardiac arrest.
- Paul Shanley, 89, American priest and convicted child rapist, heart failure.
- Billy Joe Shaver, 81, American country musician ("You Ask Me To"), stroke.
- Tracy Smothers, 58, American professional wrestler (SMW, WCW, ECW), lymphoma.
- Anthony van den Pol, 71, Swedish-born American neurosurgeon.
- Robert Wells, 87, Canadian jurist and politician, NL MHA (1972–1979), Justice of the Supreme Court of Newfoundland and Labrador (1986–2008) and President of the CBA (1985–1986).
- Wen Fubo, 95, Chinese hydraulic engineer, member of the Chinese Academy of Engineering.
- Teruko Yokoi, 96, Japanese-Swiss artist.

=== 29 ===
- Karim Akbari Mobarakeh, 67, Iranian actor (Mokhtarnameh, Shaheed-e-Kufa) and film director, COVID-19.
- Angelika Amon, 53, Austrian-American molecular and cell biologist, ovarian cancer.
- Valeriy Babych, 67, Ukrainian politician, Deputy (1994–2002), economist and businessman, COVID-19.
- Sir Peter Badge, 88, British solicitor.
- Ves Balodis, 87, Latvian-born Australian Olympic discus thrower.
- Margaret Birch, 99, Canadian politician, Ontario MPP (1971–1985).
- Roger Closset, 87, French fencer, Olympic silver medalist (1956).
- Stephen Davies, 85, Australian ornithologist.
- Sindika Dokolo, 48, Congolese art collector and businessman, free diving accident.
- Sukumar Hansda, 63, Indian politician, member (since 2011) and Deputy Speaker (since 2018) of the West Bengal Legislative Assembly, prostate cancer.
- Jim Hicks, 81, American baseball player (Chicago White Sox, California Angels).
- Roland Hobart, 79, Austrian-born American artist.
- Amir Ishemgulov, 60, Russian biologist and politician.
- Essex Johnson, 74, American football player (Cincinnati Bengals).
- Jim Lander, 90, American politician, member of the South Carolina Senate (1993–1999), Comptroller General of South Carolina (1999–2003).
- Pablo Lozano, 87, Spanish bullfighter and fighting bull cattle rancher, COVID-19.
- Ronald MacKenzie, 86, American politician.
- Jacques Maigne, 69, French writer, cancer.
- Felix Malyarenko, 69, Russian writer, COVID-19.
- Ulfat Mustafin, 61, Russian politician, COVID-19.
- Keshubhai Patel, 92, Indian politician, MP (1977–1980, 2002–2008), Chief Minister (1995, 1998–2001) and Deputy Chief Minister (1990) of Gujarat, respiratory failure.
- Shyama Charan Pati, 80, Indian dancer.
- Yury Ponomaryov, 74, Russian politician, Deputy (2001–2003), COVID-19.
- Valentin Pokrovsky, 91, Russian epidemiologist and infectionist, President of the Russian Academy of Medical Sciences (1987–2006).
- Larry Questad, 77, American Olympic sprinter (1968).
- Arturo Rivera, 75, Mexican painter, cerebral hemorrhage.
- Travis Roy, 45, American philanthropist and hockey player (Boston University Terriers), complications of paralysis-related surgery.
- H. Tati Santiesteban, 85, American politician, member of the Texas House of Representatives (1967–1973) and Senate (1973–1991), COVID-19.
- Béla Síki, 97, Hungarian pianist.
- Archie Spigner, 92, American politician, member of the New York City Council (1974–2001).
- Thilo Thielke, 51, German journalist and writer.
- Noel Trigg, 89, Welsh boxer and politician.
- Alexander Vedernikov, 56, Russian conductor (Bolshoi Theatre, Odense Symphony Orchestra, Royal Danish Opera), COVID-19.
- Watt W. Webb, 93, American biophysicist.
- J. J. Williams, 72, Welsh rugby union player (Llanelli, national team, British and Irish Lions).
- James Wu, 98, Hong Kong businessman.
- Slaven Zambata, 80, Croatian footballer (Dinamo Zagreb, Waregem, national team).
- Józef Zawitkowski, 81, Polish Roman Catholic prelate, auxiliary bishop of Warsaw (1990–1992) and Łowicz (1992–2013).

=== 30 ===
- Herb Adderley, 81, American Hall of Fame football player (Green Bay Packers, Dallas Cowboys).
- Maurice Arbez, 76, French Olympic ski jumper (1968).
- Gilles Azzopardi, 53, French actor (Sous le soleil, Le Miroir de l'eau, Plus belle la vie) and theatre director.
- Jan Bach, 82, American composer.
- Rick Baldwin, 67, American baseball player (New York Mets), complications from COVID-19.
- Kalidás Barreto, 88, Portuguese trade unionist.
- Ricardo Blume, 87, Peruvian actor (Intimidad de los parques, All of Them Witches, Fuera del cielo) and theater director.
- Byron Bradfute, 82, American football player (Dallas Cowboys), COVID-19.
- Chen Haozhu, 95, Chinese physician, member of the Chinese Academy of Engineering.
- Bernard Dixon, 82, British science journalist (New Scientist).
- Robert Fisk, 74, English writer and journalist (The Independent).
- Maurice Goldring, 87, French academic and writer.
- Anders Hansson, 28, Swedish racewalker, cancer.
- Ed Hurst, 94, American radio personality (WFPG).
- Kim Nam-chun, 31, South Korean footballer (Seoul, Sangju Sangmu), suicide.
- Žarko Knežević, 73, Montenegrin basketball player (OKK Beograd, Fenerbahçe, Yugoslavia national team).
- Miloš Kolejka, 94, Czech Olympic gymnast (1952).
- Jean-Marie Le Chevallier, 83, French politician, Deputy (1997–1998) and mayor of Toulon (1995–2001).
- Nélson Lisboa, 90, Brazilian Olympic basketball player (1956).
- Madam Auring, 80, Filipino fortune teller.
- Paul-Baudouin Michel, 90, Belgian composer.
- Jan Myrdal, 93, Swedish author and political activist, sepsis.
- Amfilohije Radović, 82, Montenegrin Orthodox prelate, Bishop of Banat (1985–1990) and Metropolitan Bishop of Montenegro and the Littoral (since 1990), COVID-19.
- Lon Satton, 93, American singer and actor (Starlight Express, Live and Let Die, Revenge of the Pink Panther).
- Pete Self, 97, American politician.
- David Shutt, Baron Shutt of Greetland, 78, British politician, member of the House of Lords (since 2000) and Captain of the Yeomen of the Guard (2010–2012).
- Abe Sklar, 94, American mathematician.
- Joe Stell, 92, American politician.
- Nobby Stiles, 78, English football player (Manchester United, national team) and manager (Preston North End), World Cup winner (1966).
- Arthur Wills, 94, English organist and composer.
- Edward Worlidge, 92, British Olympic rower.
- Mesut Yılmaz, 72, Turkish politician, Prime Minister (1991, 1996, 1997–1999), Minister of Foreign Affairs (1987–1990) and MP (1983–2002, 2007–2011), lung cancer.

=== 31 ===
- Michel Auger, 76, Canadian journalist, pancreatitis.
- Yehonatan Berick, 52, Israeli-born violinist, cancer.
- Alex Byrne, 87, Scottish footballer (Celtic).
- Gérard Caron, 82, French designer.
- Eduardo Castelló, 80, Spanish racing cyclist.
- Sir Sean Connery, 90, Scottish actor (Dr. No, The Untouchables, Indiana Jones and the Last Crusade), Oscar winner (1988), heart failure and pneumonia.
- Betty Dodson, 91, American sex educator.
- R. Doraikkannu, 72, Indian politician, member of the Tamil Nadu Legislative Assembly (since 2006), complications from COVID-19.
- Debra Doyle, 67, American author, cardiac arrest.
- Marc Fosset, 71, French jazz guitarist.
- Jacques Golliet, 88, French politician, Senator from Haute-Savoie (1986–1995).
- Charles Gordon, 73, American film producer (Field of Dreams, Die Hard, The Rocketeer), cancer.
- Najmiddin Karim, 71, Iraqi politician, Governor of Kirkuk (2011–2017) and member of the Council of Representatives (2010–2011).
- Orlando Lampa, 76, Filipino sprinter, cardiac arrest.
- Moos Linneman, 89, Dutch Olympic boxer.
- Arturo Lona Reyes, 94, Mexican Roman Catholic prelate, Bishop of Tehuantepec (1971–2001), COVID-19.
- Jalal Malaksha, 69, Iranian poet, stroke.
- MF Doom, 49, British rapper (KMD, Madvillain), songwriter ("Rhymes Like Dimes"), and record producer, angioedema.
- Gary A. Myers, 83, American politician, member of the U.S. House of Representatives (1975–1979).
- Robert Obojski, 91, American author.
- Laurence Pope, 75, American diplomat, ambassador to Chad (1993–1996).
- Barbara Ann Rowan, 82, American attorney, COVID-19.
- Horacio Serpa, 77, Colombian politician, Minister of Interior (1994–1997), Senator (1985–1988, 2014–2018) and Governor of Santander (2008–2012).
- Iba Der Thiam, 83, Senegalese politician, Vice-President of the National Assembly (2001–2012).
- Rudolf Zahradník, 92, Czech chemist, president of the Czech Academy of Sciences (1993–2001).
- Marius Žaliūkas, 36, Lithuanian footballer (FBK Kaunas, Hearts, national team), complications from motor neuron disease.
