= Pierre Jourdan =

Pierre Jourdan may refer to:

- Pierre Jourdan (actor)
- Pierre Jourdan (politician)
