= Forget =

Forget may refer to:

- Forgetting, an apparent loss or modification of information already encoded and stored in an individual's long-term memory

== People with the surname ==
Nota bene: this surname is pronounced fɔʁʒɛ in French, and is not to be confused with the English verb fɔɹˈɡɛt.

- Amédée E. Forget (1847–1923), Canadian lawyer and politician
- Camille Pellerin-Forget, Quebec politician
- Claude Forget (born 1936), Canadian politician
- Guy Forget (born 1965), former French tennis player
- Joachim Son-Forget (born 1983), South Korean-born French politician
- Louis-Joseph Forget (1853–1911), Canadian businessman and politician
- Maud Forget (born 1982), French actress
- Michel Forget (born 1942), Canadian actor
- Michel Forget (1927–2020), French military pilot
- Monique Jérôme-Forget (born 1940), Canadian psychologist and politician
- Rodolphe Forget (1861–1919), Canadian business investor, stockbroker and politician

== Places ==
- Forget, Ontario, a community in Ontario, Canada
- Forget, Saskatchewan, a village in Saskatchewan, Canada
- Saint-Forget, a commune in the Yvelines department, in France
- Mount Forget, located on the border of Alberta and British Columbia

== Media ==
- "Forget", a song by 8stops7 from Birth of a Cynic
- "Forget", a song by Marina and the Diamonds from FROOT
- ”Forget”, a song by Pogo from Kindred Shadows
- Forget (Twin Shadow album), 2010
- Forget (Xiu Xiu album), 2017
- "Forget" (The Walking Dead), an episode of the television series The Walking Dead

== See also ==
- Memory
- Distraction
- Procrastination
