= Xavier Boulanger =

French actor (1962–2020)

- Born: 1962; Forbach, France
- Died: 20 October 2020 (aged 57–58)
- Occupation: Actor

Xavier Boulanger (1962 – 20 October 2020) was a French actor.

== Biography ==
Boulanger trained as an actor at the Conservatoire de Strasbourg. He began his career acting as Mowgli in a stage production of Rudyard Kipling's The Jungle Book. He acted at the Théâtre d'Auxerre and the National Theatre of Strasbourg. He starred as King Lear in the play of the same name by William Shakespeare at the Théâtre de Sartrouville. He also had a career on the screen and often dubbed over movies in English.

== Filmography ==
- Liberté, liberté chérie (1993)
- Le Petit Monde de Pierre (1993)
- Les Alsaciens ou les Deux Mathilde (1995)
- For Ever Mozart (1996)
- L'Inconnu de Strasbourg (1997)
- Party Time (1999)
- L'Ami Fritz (2001)
- Une Douce Jeunesse (2003)
- Luther (2004)
- Les Miettes (2006)
- La Résistance (2007)
- La Saison des orphelins (2007)
- Le Nouveau Protocole (2008)
- The Day Will Come (2008)
- L'Affaire Paul Dumont (2008)
- Black out (2009)
- L'homme de la berge (2009)
- Mike (2010)
- Tous les soleils (2010)
- A la longue (2011)
- Le Défi des Bâtisseurs (2012)
- Une vie de Théâtre (2012)
- Comme si (2014)
- Les Bêtises (2014)
- Gutenberg (2016)
- Capitaine Marleau (2016)
- Zone Blanche (2016)
- Perdrix (2018)
- Un avion sans elle (2019)
