= Wen Fubo =

Chinese engineer (1925–2020)

- 文伏波
- Born: August 4, 1925; Taojiang County, Hunan, China
- Died: October 28, 2020 (aged 95); Wuhan, Hubei, China
- Education: National Central University
- Children: 3
- Scientific career
- Fields: Water conservation
- Workplaces: Yangtze River Water Resources Commission

Wen Fubo (Chinese: 文伏波; pinyin: Wén Fūbō; 4 August 1925 – 28 October 2020) was a Chinese engineer specialized in water conservation.

== Biography ==
Wen was born in Taojiang County, Hunan, on 4 August 1925. In October 1943, he entered National Central University, where he majored in water conservation. In 1944, he joined the Chinese Expeditionary Force. He joined the Chinese Communist Party in January 1949. After a brief term in the government, he worked at the Nanjing Yangtze River Water Conservancy Bureau in October 1949. In January 1950, he became an official at the Yangtze River Water Resources Commission, where he was promoted to its director in January 1986. He was design team leader of Danjiangkou Water Control Project and Gezhouba Water Control Project. He retired in July 2018. On 28 October 2020, he died of illness in Wuhan, Hubei, at the age of 95.

== Personal life ==
Wen had three children.

== Honours and awards ==
- 1985 State Science and Technology Progress Award for Gezhouba Water Control Project (Special Award)
- 1994 Member of the Chinese Academy of Engineering (CAE)
