= Philippe Salaün =

French photographer (1943–2020)

- Born: 4 March 1943; Plonévez-du-Faou, France
- Died: 4 October 2020 (aged 77); Paris, France
- Occupation: Photographer

Philippe Salaün (4 March 1943 – 4 October 2020) was a French photographer.

== Biography ==
Salaün was born on 4 March 1943 in Plonévez-du-Faou in Finistère. He spent much of his childhood living in Réunion before returning to mainland France, living in Châteauroux. He first took up photography during his service in the Algerian War and became infatuated with it during a photo exhibition in Le Havre in 1968.

After learning a black and white printing method, Salaün decided to open his own workshop. He received a scholarship from the French National Foundation of Photography and studied in the United States alongside Ansel Adams and Jerry Uelsmann at the University of Arizona.

Upon his return to France, Salaün worked in his workshop on Rue Beaurepaire in Paris, where, throughout his career, many different artists entrusted their photographs to him. He regularly photographed during his global travels, saying "For a long time, I had above all a predilection for day to day images and a humorous tone, but in recent years, I am seduced by the surprises that travel photography has in store, in particular portraits". In South America, he travelled to Colombia, Peru, and Bolivia. He also shot photographs of U.S. Route 66, Vietnam, China, Japan, Mali, and Réunion, where he retraced the footsteps of his childhood.

After he turned 60, Salaün displayed 60 different photographs in an exhibition titled 60 X 60, a collection of which was published by Éditions Alternatives, Maison européenne de la photographie, and Éditions Paradox in October 2006.

Philippe Salaün died due to cancer in Paris on 4 October 2020 at the age of 77.

== Notable photographs ==
- La Vie de château (1973)
- Domecy-sur-le-Vault (1973)
- Le chien fantôme. Canal Saint-Martin (1974)
- Exposition canine (1976)
- Cheval noir à tête blanche (1976)
- Ty Cam (1977)
- Fauves (1980)
- Hommage à Fontcuberta. Nîmes (1980)
- L'imperméable de cheval. Tharon (1981)
- Casaanita Cadaques, 31 mars 86 (1986)
- American bar, Route 66, New Mexico (1991)
- Mitsu et le tapis (1993)
- Le Dieu Éléphant (1993)
- Mitsu et les poissons (1994)
- Chien solitaire (1999)
- Toro pyrotechnique (2000)
- Le Bouledogue bistrot (2001)

== Publications ==
- Rencontres francophones, 2 (1988)
- Philippe Salaün (1992)
- 60 X 60 (2006)

== Prizes ==
- Prize of the Villa Lumière

== Expositions ==
=== Personal exhibitions ===
- Chalon-sur-Saône (1992)
- La Route 66, Chartres (2003)
- 60x60, Paris (2004)
- Les montagnards du Vietnam, Paris (2006)
- Médiathèque Opale Sud, Berck (2013)
- Bloom Gallery, Osaka (2013)
- Philippe Salaün, tireur exposé, Paris (2017)

=== Collective exhibitions ===
- Rencontres francophones, 2, La Rochelle (1988)
- Ruptures - Ados à Paris, Paris (2010)
- La photographie en France, 1950-2000, Paris (2012)
- La Bretagne, Collection photographique de L'Imagerie ‐ Lannion, Clermont (2014)
- Four French Photographers, Asheville (2018)
