= Felix Malyarenko =

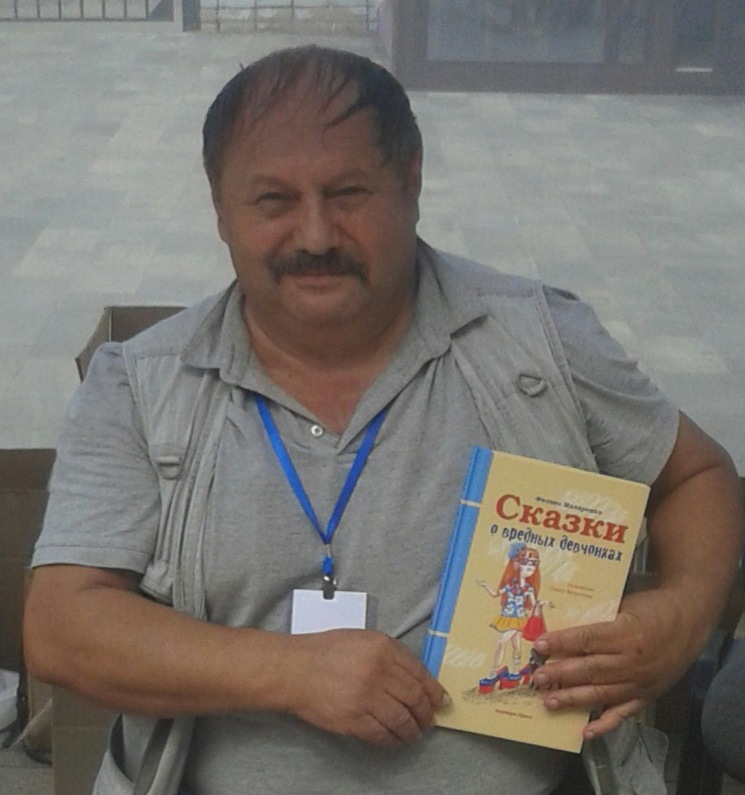
Malyarenko in 2019

Felix Vasilyevich Malyarenko (2 February 1951 – 29 October 2020) was a Russian Army officer, poet and prose writer, author of works for children and youth. He was Chairman of the Saratov regional branch of the Russian Union of Writers from 2017 to 2019.

== Biography ==
Malyarenko was born on 2 February 1951, in Birobidzhan, the son of a worker at the Dalselmash plant, Vasily Petrovich Malyarenko, and of a seller, Polina Iosifovna. After attending secondary school, in 1962 he entered the Ussuriysk Suvorov military school, and from 1969 to 1974 he studied at the Military Academy of Chemical Defense in Saratov. In 1986 he participated in the liquidation efforts of the accident at the Chernobyl nuclear power plant. He retired from the Army with the rank of lieutenant colonel.

He started his literary activity in the mid-1980s, and in the subsequent decades he conducted social activities, held creative meetings with schoolchildren in Saratov, travelled to literary meetings and festivals, participated in book exhibitions, fairs and literary prizes. In June 2019, he took part in the book exhibition "Red Square" in Moscow, where he presented the book "Tales of Harmful Girls".

More than two dozen board games based on his books have been created for children and adults. Saratov singer Vladislava Oksyuta performed songs to the verses of Malyarenko.

In 2014 and 2017, Malyarenko was among the ten best-selling children's writers in Russia. The total circulation of his books for all the years amounted to almost three million copies. He was a member of the International Union of Writers named after Saints Cyril and Methodius (Bulgaria), member of the editorial board of SMEs, and from 2017 to 2019 he served as chairman of the Saratov regional branch of the Russian Union of Writers.

Malyarenko was married and had three children.

== Writing career ==
Malyarenko published his first stories in the 1986 book "Vovka Bulkin iz shestogo „B“" (1986). He also wrote for newspapers "Uchitelskaya Gazeta", "Krasnaya Zvezda" and "Pionerskaya Pravda" and for magazines "Soviet Woman" and "Misha", and participated in radio broadcasts. In 1991, he published a detective story for children, “Colorful Butterflies”.

Memories of studying at the Suvorov School formed the basis of the story "Suvorov's Sobolev, get in line!". The book was being prepared for publication by "Detgiz", and illustrations were made, but the publishing system collapsed following the collapse of the Soviet Union, preventing the book from being published. In a slightly edited form, the book was published only in 2013.

Between 2011 and 2014 Malyarenko wrote the plays "Who Stole Birthday?", "Tales of Mischievous Girls", "Lord of Bubbles" and "The Latest Adventures of Puss in Boots", which were performed at the Children's Musical Theater. "Who Stole the Birthday?" and "Tales of Mischievous Girls" were recorded on discs. In 2016 "Who Stole Your Birthday?" was also performed at the M. Gorky Russian Drama Theater in Makhachkala.

In the “Literary Almanac. Issue 1 ", published in 2017 as part of the "Writers of the Saratov Land" project, two stories by Malyarenko were published: "Calluses" and "And you dude, comrade captain".

The book of poems "The ABC of Birobidzhan" (2017) became a gift for the author's hometown, Birobidzhan. Malyarenko also published a book in memory of the oldest journalist of the Jewish Autonomous Oblast, Nina Nikolaevna Filipkina, containing poems, translations, a cycle of essays "Golden feathers of Birobidzhan" - about writers and poets who left their mark on the history of the city and region.

In 2018, he began cooperation with the Moscow publishing house "Apriori-press", where he published the books "Give a paw, man", "Tale about Masha and semolina", "These are the pigs", "Tales of pigs" and "Tales of harmful girls".

== Death ==
Malyarenko died of COVID-19 on 29 October 2020, at the age of 69 during the COVID-19 pandemic in Russia.

== Awards ==
- Medal "For Life Saving" for participation in the liquidation efforts after Chernobyl disaster
- Diploma and commemorative medal from the Moscow Regional Duma for his great contribution to children's literature at the festival "Image of Crimea"
- Grand Prize in the nomination "Children's Literature" of the X International Literary and Art Festival "Russian Myths"
- Laureate (2nd place) of the IV International Literary and Music Festival in Saki "Intelligent Season" (nomination "Poetry for Children")
- Laureate (1st place in the category "Children's Literature"), 1st degree diploma of the International Literary Competition "Slavic Word" named after Boris Aprilov
- Laureate (1st place) for participation in the Literary competition within the framework of the exhibition "Book Boulevard of Sevastopol"
