= Yasuto Mushiake =

Japanese telecommunications engineer

- Born: 28 March 1921; Okayama Prefecture, Japan
- Died: 6 October 2020 (aged 99)
- Education: Tohoku University
- Occupation: Telecommunications engineer

Yasuto Mushiake (28 March 1921 – 6 October 2020) was a Japanese telecommunications engineer. He was named a fellow of the Institute of Electrical and Electronics Engineers, "for contributions to linear antennas and self-complementary antennas".

Mushiake died on 6 October 2020, at the age of 99.
