= Jean Schalit =

French journalist (1937–2020)

- Born: 1937
- Died: 13 October 2020 (aged 83)
- Occupation: Journalist

Jean Schalit (1937 – 13 October 2020) was a French journalist.

== Biography ==
Schalit was born into a Jewish family. His father, Henri Schalit, was a leading editor for L'Information, then ran the magazine Sciences et voyages after World War II. His mother was related to the Offenstadt brothers, who published Bibi Fricotin, Fillette, and Les Pieds Nickelés.

Schalit began to work in the press in the early 1960s for the journal Clarté, alongside Serge July, Bernard Kouchner, Jean-François Kahn, and Michel-Antoine Burnier. Schalit helped organize the Union of Communist Students within the French Communist Party (PCF). He was one of the leaders of a committee against the Vietnam War, which led to him being kicked out of the French Communist Party for leading a meeting of other opponents of the Party's elite.

In May 1968, the Union Nationale des Étudiants de France, Jeunesse communiste révolutionnaire, and the Movement of 22 March created a newspaper. Schalit worked with his fellow comrades who had been excluded from the PCF to create Action, a militant newspaper first published on 7 May 1968. The newspaper folded in June 1969.

After his newspaper folded, Schalit began working for Robert Delpire and as a creative director for McCann. In the early 1980s, he worked alongside Jean-François Bizot to recreate the magazine Actuel, of which he was editor-in-chief for three years. In the years that followed, he took part in multiple unsuccessful press projects, including, Le Monde illustré, Le Grand Paris, and Numéro 1.

In 1988, Schalit moved to the United Kingdom with his friends Emile Laugier and Jean Cavé. They began working for The European. There, he met Roger Faligot and Peter Ustinov, who founded the newspaper. In 1990, Schalit returned to France to create the daily newspaper La Truffe. However, the newspaper was a failure, leading him to create Jean Schalit Infographie (JSI), specializing in computer graphics and image production, and was a success.

In the early 2000s, Schalit began writing books for children, creating the "Professeur Gamberge – Giboulées" collection with Gallimard Jeunesse. In 2011, he became the President and Director of the Lieux Mouvants festival, an inter-disciplinary cultural event organized every year in Brittany.

Jean Schalit died on 13 October 2020.

== Publications ==
- Professeur Gamberge (2010)
- À quoi sert l'Union européenne ? (2010)
- Les Canadair, comment ça marche ? (2010)
- La crise économique, qu'est-ce que c'est ? (2010)
- Pourquoi les dinosaures ont-ils disparu ? (2010)
- Pourquoi, quand et comment paye-t-on des impôts ? (2010)
- Pourquoi y a-t-il de la violence sur les stades ? (2010)
- Pourquoi y a-t-il des chiens qui attaquent des gens ? (2010)
- Pourquoi y a-t-il des clandestins ? (2010)
- Qu'est-ce que l'effet de serre ? (2010)
- Qu'est-ce qu'un tsunami ? (2010)
- Y a-t-il une vie ailleurs que sur la terre ? (2010)
- Pourquoi Israéliens et Palestiniens se font-ils la guerre ? (2010)
- Pourquoi les champions gagnent autant d'argent ? (2011)
- À quoi ça sert de voter ? (2011)
- À quoi ça sert, les banques ? (2011)
- C'est quoi être raciste ? (2011)
- C'est quoi, le piratage sur Internet ? (2011)
- Est-ce que la Chine va devenir aussi puissante que les États-Unis ? (2011)
- C'est quoi, un paradis fiscal ? (2012)
- Comment et pourquoi on rêve ? (2012)
