= Jean-Claude Pasche =

Swiss theatre director (1940–2020)

- Born: 20 June 1940; Servion, Switzerland
- Died: 24 October 2020 (aged 80)
- Occupation: Theatre director

Jean-Claude Pasche (20 June 1940 – 24 October 2020) was a Swiss theatre director.

== Biography ==
Pasche earned a diploma in singing from the Lausanne Conservatory and subsequently worked in the family restaurant, La Croix-Blanche. Beginning in 1965, he arranged cabaret shows in a barn on his family's farm, which had been converted into a performance hall by his grandfather. In 1967, he directed the Revue de Servion on the advice of Jacques Béranger, director of the Lausanne Opera. After the success of the Revue, Pasche expanded the performance hall into a 500-seat room called the Café-Théâtre de Servion, which opened in 1980. He installed a pipe organ weighing more than 500 kg and had over 350 pipes. He then renamed his performance hall the Théâtre Barnabé after his stage name (Barnabé). In 2005, he created a foundation which gained recognition for his theatre as a public utility by the Canton of Vaud.

Jean-Claude Pasche died on 24 October 2020 at the age of 80.
