= James Kennedy (cricketer) =

Scottish cricketer (1949–2020)

Personal information
- Full name: James Henry Kennedy
- Born: 23 April 1949; Glasgow, Scotland
- Died: 26 October 2020 (aged 71)
- Source: Cricinfo, 17 April 2021

James Kennedy (23 April 1949 – 26 October 2020) was a Scottish cricketer and gynaecologist. He played in four matches for the Scotland cricket team, two of them with first-class status. The first one was against Ireland in 1970, and the second against a touring Pakistan side in 1971.
