= Jan Martinette =

American politician (1938–2020)

Member of the Missouri House of Representatives from the 47th district
- In office January 9, 1985 – January 9, 1991
- Preceded by: Harold Esser
- Succeeded by: Thomas Hoppe

Personal details
- Born: June 23, 1938 Kansas City, Missouri
- Died: October 27, 2020 (aged 82) Grandview, Missouri
- Party: Republican

Jan Martinette (June 23, 1938 – October 27, 2020) was an American politician who served in the Missouri House of Representatives from the 47th district from 1985 to 1991.

She died on October 27, 2020, in Grandview, Missouri at age 82.
