= Hubert Astier =

French public official and politician (1938–2020)

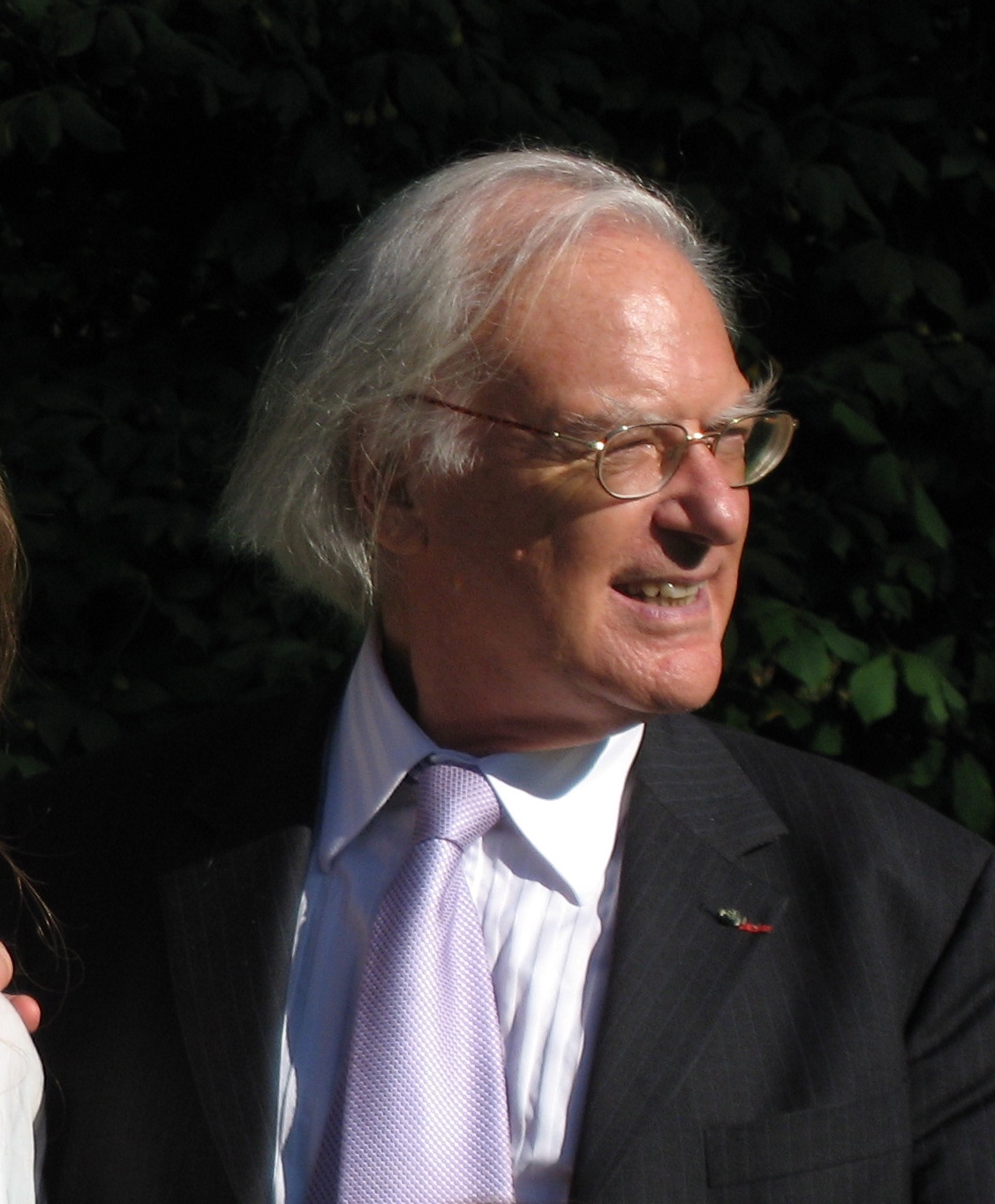
- Born: 8 July 1938; Marseille, France
- Died: 28 October 2020 (aged 82); Nice, France
- Occupations: Public Official; Politician

Hubert Astier (8 July 1938 – 28 October 2020) was a French public official and politician.

== Biography ==
A graduate of Sciences Po in Paris, Astier entered the École nationale d'administration in February 1963. He began his career in 1965 with the Ministry of the Interior in the office of the general directorate of local authorities.

In 1966, Astier became a subprefect in Essonne before joining the Fondation Nationale des Sciences Politiques, where he led development and town planning. In November 1971, Minister of Cultural Affairs Jacques Duhamel called Astier to be his technical advisor. He oversaw the teaching of architecture throughout France. His successor, Maurice Druon, took over the role in October 1973. However, Alain Peyrefitte, the new Minister of Cultural Affairs, brought Astier back to the position in March 1974. After Peyrefitte left the job, Michel Guy took over and appointed him chief of staff in 1975.

In 1992, Astier became cultural director of the Rally for the Republic party. Jacques Toubon named him as his Private Secretary in 1993. On 2 October 1995, President Jacques Chirac appointed him as President of the Public Establishment of the Palace, Museum and National Estate of Versailles. He was reappointed in 2000. He kept the position until 7 July 2003. At the end of his term of office, he said "The public establishment really lives in a logic of private enterprise".

In June 2004, Le Figaro announced an investigation into a "system of overbilling" leading to the creation of fictitious deficits in Versailles. A colleague of Astier, who ran Les Productions du Roi-Soleil, a company producing shows for the public and declared bankruptcy with a deficit of 5 million euros, was implicated in the investigation. Astier was placed in police custody for two days and interviewed as a simple witness.

In 2005, Astier submitted a policy report at the request of Renaud Donnedieu de Vabres. He also wrote a book on Versailles.

Hubert Astier died in Nice on 28 October 2020 at the age of 82.

== Publications ==
- Versailles, le plaisir du roi (2000)
- Splendors of Versailles (2001)
