= Paul-Jean Hérault =

French writer and journalist (1934–2020)

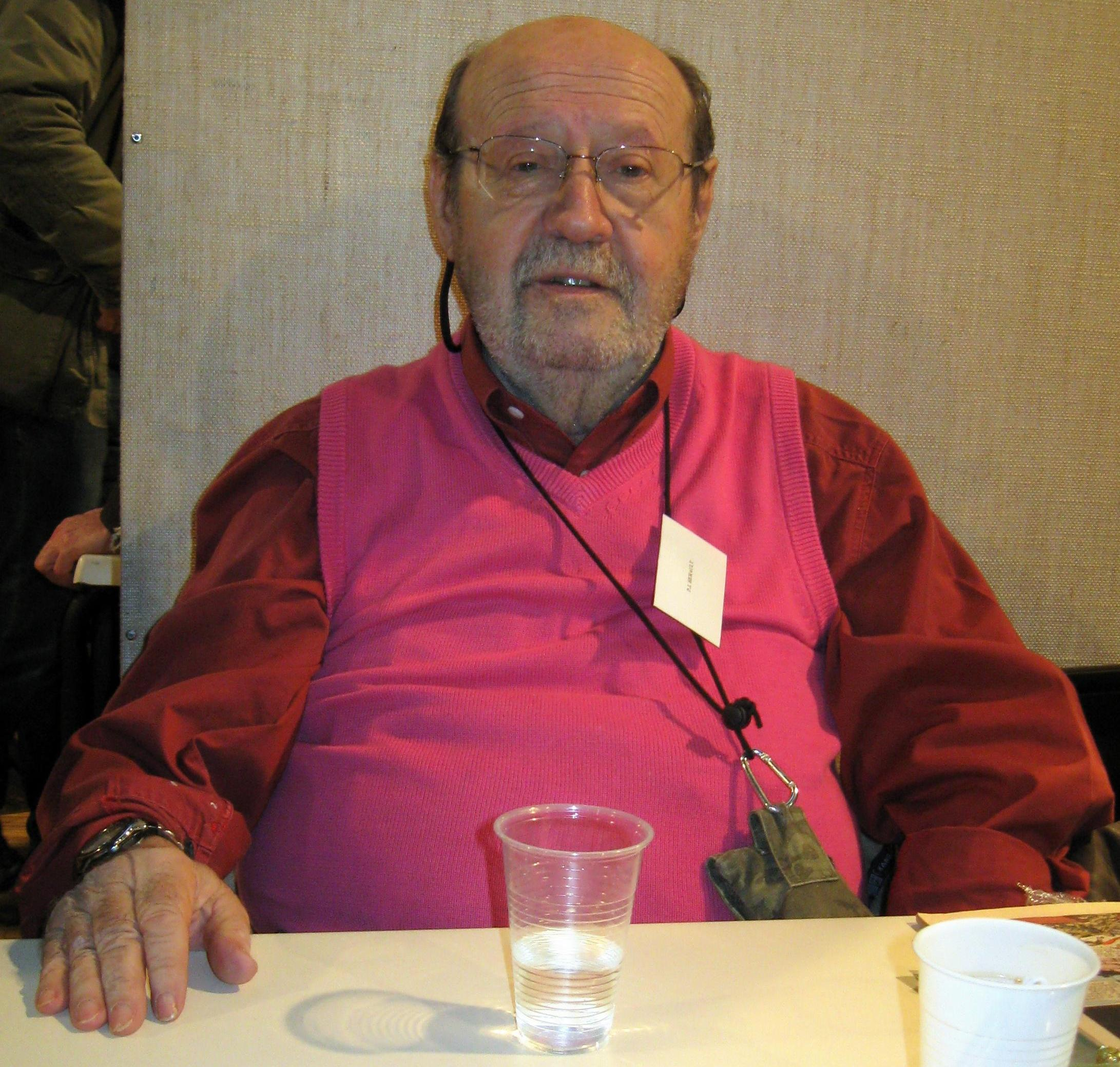
- Hérault in 2010
- Born: Michel Rigaud; 22 September 1934; Paris, France
- Died: 26 October 2020 (aged 86)
- Occupations: Writer; Journalist

Paul-Jean Hérault, pseudonym of Michel Rigaud (22 September 1934 – 26 October 2020), was a French writer and journalist.

== Biography ==
Michel Rigaud was born in the 14th arrondissement of Paris on 22 September 1934. He completed his secondary studies at the Lycée Michelet in Vanves. During World War II, he fled Paris and lived in Niort. He studied law at the Paris Law Faculty before attending the École supérieure de journalisme de Paris and the École des Hautes Études Sociales et Internationales. He fought in the Algerian War for 26 months, serving as an intelligence officer in their operational zone. After his military service, he became a journalist for various newspapers. He worked for Paris-Presse, Candide, L'Aurore, Paris Jour, RTL, and Télé Star. He helped with the foundation of the magazine Aviation 2000.

At the beginning of the 1970s, Rigaud began writing spy novels for Fleuve éditions. To publish these novels, it was advised that he take a pseudonym. He was inspired by the name of his paternal grandmother, and began writing as Paul-Jean Hérault. He then turned to the genre of science fiction, motivated by money and ability to tell stories he liked. His publisher sent him stories, and thus, he was inspired by the works of Peter Randa and Gilles-Maurice Dumoulin. His first science fiction novel was titled Le Rescapé de la Terre, which began the series Cal de Ter. In total, he wrote more than 30 novels.

In 1996, the novel Ceux qui ne voulaient pas mourir, and Fleuve éditions began to limit Hérault to 220 pages per story. Disappointed, he retired early at the age of 60. In 2005, he received the Prix Rosny-Aîné, awarded at the Convention nationale française de science-fiction. He returned to writing with the novel Millecrabe, written in the space of two and half years.

Paul-Jean Hérault died of a stroke on 26 October 2020 at the age of 86.

== Works ==
=== Spy Novels ===
- Réseaux Sommeil (1971)
- Stratégie détonateur (1971)
- Le Barrage maudit (1972)

=== Science fiction ===
==== Cal de Ter ====
- Le Rescapé de la Terre (1975)
- Les Bâtisseurs du monde (1976)
- La Planète folle (1977)
- Hors contrôle (1979)
- 37 minutes pour survivre (1979)
- Chak de Palar (1980)
- Cal de Ter (1984)

==== Gurvan ====
- Sergent-pilote Gurvan (durée des équipages: 61 missions… -1) (1987)
- Gurvan: les premières victoires (durée des équipages: 61 missions… -2) (1987)
- Officier-pilote Gurvan (durée des équipages: 61 missions… -3) (1988)

==== La Treizième Génération ====
- Ross et Berkel (1990)
- Pédric et Bo (1990)

==== Independent Science Fiction Novels ====
- La Fresque (1981)
- Le Dernier Pilote (1984)
- Le Bricolo (1986)
- Le Raid infernal (1986)
- La Famille (1987)
- Danger: mémoire (1991)
- Le Loupiot (1991)
- Hors normes (1992)
- Le Chineur de l'espace (1995)
- Ceux qui ne voulaient pas mourir (1996)
- La Fédération de l'Amas (2004)
- Les Ennemis (2005)
- Les Clones déviants (2005)
- Criminels de guerre (2006)
- Régression (2006)
- Le Destitué (2008)
- La Grande migration (2008)
- Quand il ne reste que l'honneur... (2011)
- Ceux qui ne voulaient pas mourir (2013)
- Le Dernier Pilote (2013)
- Le Chineur de l'espace (2014)
- Le Loupiot (2014)
- La Fresque (2015)
- Les Ennemis (2019)

=== Fiction ===
- Le Franzous (2006)
- Millecrabe (2009)
- Le Terrible Hiver 1947 (2010)
- Le Grand Bluff (2010)
- Le Gamin de spa 36 (2012)
