= John Edwin Field =

Experimental physicist (1936–2020)

John Edwin Field FRS (20 September 1936 – 21 October 2020) was a British experimental physicist whose research focused on the physics and chemistry of solids, particularly involving energetic phenomena and materials, covering a variety of topics from erosion to explosives.

Following his undergraduate studies in physics at University College London, Field moved to the Cavendish Laboratory at the University of Cambridge, undertaking his PhD in the Physics and Chemistry of Solids Group. He remained at Cambridge for the rest of his career which included terms as Head of the Physics and Chemistry of Solids Group and Deputy Head of the Cavendish Laboratory. He was also a Fellow of Magdalene College.

His achievements were recognised by an OBE in 1987 and Fellowship of the Royal Society in 1994.
