= Shyama Charan Pati =

Indian dancer (1940–2020)

- Born: 1940; Icha, Jharkhand, India
- Died: 29 October 2020 (aged 80)
- Occupation: Dancer
- Known for: Chhau dance
- Children: Susmita Pati and Devashish Pati
- Awards: Padma Shri

Shyama Charan Pati (1940 – 29 October 2020) was an Indian dancer, known as one of the leading exponents of the Seraikala tradition of Chhau, a martial dance form of India. He was a member of the Court of the Central University of Jharkhand.

== Career ==
He was born in 1940 in a poor Brahmin family in the village of Icha in the Indian state of Jharkhand, and moved to Jamshedpur and trained Kathak and Bharat Natyam under Guru Ban Bihari Acharya. Later, he also trained under gurus such as Panchanan Singh Deo and Tarini Prasad Singh Deo. He trained many students such as Sujata Maheshwari and Sovanabrata Sircar and performed on various stages in India and abroad. The Government of India awarded him the fourth highest civilian honour of the Padma Shri, in 2006, for his contributions to Indian dance. His daughter, Susmita Pati, is also an accomplished Chhau dancer.

Pati died on 29 October 2020, aged 80.

== See also ==
- Chhau dance
