= Orlando Lampa =

Filipino sprinter (1944–2020)

Personal information
- Nationality: Filipino
- Born: October 23, 1944
- Died: October 31, 2020 (aged 76) Taguig, Metro Manila, Philippines

Sport
- Sport: Sprinting
- Event: 200 meters

Orlando Lampa (23 October 1944 – 31 October 2020) was a Filipino sprinter who competed in the 1966 Asian Games.

== Career ==
He is known for coaching several athletes from Rizal, some of whom competed for the Philippines internationally in the early 1970s. This includes 1972 Summer Olympics runner Lucila Salao who set the national record of 14.3 in the 100 meter hurdles, Salao's Olympic teammate Amelita Alanes, as well as Elmer Reyes and Jaime Sabado.

Lampa in the 1980s after a break from athletics also became coach of the Philippine Navy's track and field team which won the 1987 National Open Championship. He had a son, Orlan who once held the national 100 meters junior record.

He died on October 31, 2020, due to cardiac arrest at the Taguig Medical Center.
