= Helen Lachs Ginsburg =

America economist and activist (1929–2020)

- Born: Helen Lachs; June 25, 1929; The Bronx, New York, U.S.
- Died: October 8, 2020 (aged 91); Queens County, New York, U.S.
- Education: Queens College; The New School
- Occupations: Economist, activist, professor
- Employer: Brooklyn College
- Notable work: Full Employment and Public Policy: The U.S. and Sweden; Jobs for All: A Plan for the Revitalization of America
- Spouse: Nathan Ginsburg

Helen Lachs Ginsburg (June 25, 1929 – October 8, 2020) was an American economist, activist and professor at Brooklyn College. She was a specialist in labor and social welfare, studying the public policy's implications of full employment in the United States and Sweden. A "scholar-activist", Ginsburg was an early proponent of the living wage and a founding member of the National Committee for Full Employment, co-chaired by Coretta Scott King. She authored Full Employment and Public Policy: The U.S. and Sweden (1983), a cross-national economic study of employment policy, and co-authored Jobs for All: A Plan for the Revitalization of America (1994), a manifesto for full employment.

== Early life ==
Helen Lachs was born in the Bronx, New York, on June 25, 1929. Her father William was a haberdasher and her mother, Anna (Riegelhaupt), a homemaker. She grew up in Bayside, Queens, and attended Queens College, graduating with her undergraduate degree in economics. She went on to earn a doctorate in economics from The New School.

== Career ==
In the 1970s, Ginsburg was an associate research professor at New York University; in the 1980s until retirement she was professor of economics at Brooklyn College. She specialized in labor and social welfare policies as well as comparative study of economics.

In 1975, she authored two titles in a series of research reports, published as pamphlets from the Center for Studies of Income Maintenance Policy at New York University. Her contributions were Unemployment, Subemployment and Public Policy and Unemployment or Full Employment?

In the 1970s, Ginsburg was a leading supporter of the full employment legislation proposed by Representative Augustus Hawkins (the first African American representative in Congress from California), and Senator Hubert H. Humphrey (a Democrat from Minnesota). She toured the country giving lectures to support the anti-poverty and anti-inequality bill, which would have provided a job to anyone who wanted one. The proposal is credited as a "forerunner" of later proposals like the federal job guarantee, the $15 minimum wage and the Green New Deal, which also names living-wage work as a right. However the original bill failed to pass and the legislation that was enacted did not include a full employment guarantee. This setback prompted Ginsburg to turn her attention to Sweden, studying its full employment policy. That became the subject of her book, Full Employment and Public Policy: The U.S. and Sweden (1983). Her book drew the attention of progressives to the Swedish model, prompting efforts to adopt parts in the US.

With Sheila D. Collins and Gertrude Schaffner Goldberg, Ginsburg co-authored Jobs for All: A Plan for the Revitalization of America, a 1994 manifesto for full employment. One reviewer called it a "path-breaking blueprint for dealing with perhaps the most important resurgent question of the late 20th century: Can triumphant capitalism provide employment for all who seek it? The authors conclude that it can and indeed must." Organized around 11 principles, Jobs for All laid out a program of job creation; increased minimum wage; workplace changes to be more compatible with family life and women's economic achievement; employment opportunity for disadvantaged groups; expanded civil rights and rights in the workplace; investment in public infrastructure; strengthening public finance; corporate accountability, and environmental protection.

Out of that publication grew the National Jobs for All Coalition (which became the National Jobs for All Network), as well as a legislative arm, Full Employment Action Council, both of which were initially co-chaired by Coretta Scott King, and of which Ginsburg was a founding member. For Scott King it was part of her efforts to continue the work on poverty and economic inequality that has become her husband Martin Luther King Jr.'s focus late in his life. The group advocated the position that everyone capable of working a job had a right to one and pushed back against federal economists whose policy priorities centered on the success of white men to the exclusion of others. In a 2010 article, Ginsburg wrote of the relationship of activism to employment policy: "Full employment shifts power from capital to labor, so major opposition can be expected from efforts to obtain it. Proponents need more power and a strong movement, including at the grassroots level, pushing for jobs for all--not just jobs for me or my group."

In 1990, Ginsburg was a Guest Scholar at the Wissenschaftscentrum in Berlin, continuing to pursue her comparative, cross-national work. She was a cofounder and long-time participant in Columbia University's Seminar on Full Employment, Social Welfare, and Equity, serving as its co-chair from 1999 to 2020.

Writing after Ginsburg's death, her co-author Gertrude Schaffner Goldberg remembered Ginsburg as a "model of a scholar-activist".

== Personal life ==
Ginsburg married Nathan Ginsburg in the mid-1950s. She died on October 8, 2020, aged 91, at a hospital in Queens, New York.

== Works ==
- Ginsburg, Helen. Unemployment, Subemployment and Public Policy, Center for Studies of Income Maintenance Policy, New York University, 1975.
- Ginsburg, Helen. Unemployment or Full Employment?, Center for Studies of Income Maintenance Policy, New York University, 1975.
- Ginsburg, Helen. Full employment and public policy: the United States and Sweden. Free Press, 1983.
- Collins, Sheila D., Helen Ginsburg, and Gertrude S. Goldberg. Jobs for all: A plan for the revitalization of America. New Initiatives for Full Employment, 1994.
