= Thilo Thielke =

German journalist and writer (1968–2020)

- Born: 24 January 1968; Hanover, West Germany
- Died: 29 October 2020 (aged 51); Tanzania
- Occupations: Journalist; Writer

Thilo Thielke (24 January 1968 – 29 October 2020) was a German journalist and writer.

== Biography ==
In 1985, Thielke was hired as a journalist for the daily newspaper Neuve Presse. From 1990 to 1996, he was editor-in-chief of the television program Spiegel TV and their reports on the Balkans.[8 German] In 1996, he was awarded a prize at the New York Television Festival for his work on the Yugoslav Wars. The following year, he began working for the magazine Der Spiegel. From 2003 to 2008, he was a correspondent in Nairobi, where his children were born, then in Bangkok. In 2013, he lived with his family in a lodge on Mount Kilimanjaro.

Thielke wrote numerous books on contemporary history in countries such as Kenya, Sudan and the Philippines. He also wrote about footballer Reinhard Libuda. His first book, Eine Liebe in Auschwitz, helped him rise to fame. A biographical novel, it contained elements of journalistic reporting and historical and political documentation.

Other places where Thielke worked as a journalist include Die Achse des Guten and The European.

Thilo Thielke died in Tanzania on 29 October 2020, at the age of 52 and was found dead in his lodge while on a research trip. He died of a heart attack.

== Works ==
- Eine Liebe in Auschwitz (2000)
- « An Gott kommt keiner vorbei... » Das Leben des Reinhard « Stan » Libuda (2002)
- Krieg im Lande des Mahdi: Darfur und der Zerfall des Sudan (2006)
- Kenia: Reportagen aus dem Inneren eines zerissenen Lande (2008)
- TraumFußball: Afrikanische Fußballgeschichten (2009)
- Philippinen: Unterwegs im Land der 7000 Inseln (2011)
- Thailand 151: Portrait des farbenfrohen Königreichs in 151 Momentaufnahmen (2013)
- Tansania - Reportagen und Reiseberichte aus dem Herzen Ostafrikas (2015)
- Reiseführer Tansania, Sansibar: Reisen mit Insider-Tipps. Inklusive kostenloser (2016)

== Awards ==
- Nomination for the Axel-Springer-Preis for his Auschwitz report Auf dem Boden der Hölle (2000)
