= Richard C. Dorf =

American engineer and professor (1933–2020)

Richard C. Dorf (December 27, 1933, in the Bronx, New York City – October 22, 2020) was a professor emeritus of management and electrical and computer engineering at the University of California, Davis. He received his Ph.D. from the U.S. Naval Postgraduate School. Dorf was a Life Fellow of the IEEE for contributions to engineering education and control theory, and was a fellow of the American Society for Engineering Education.

== Career ==
=== Research and academia ===
Dorf researched and taught control systems, robotics, energy systems, technology management, entrepreneurship, innovation management, non-profit management, new venture management, venture capital management, and technology policy. He was also a consultant in engineering business development, and taught classes in the area as well.

=== Author and editor ===
Dorf was a prolific author and editor. He has authored 30 books, including several standard handbooks and textbooks of engineering. His latest book is called Technology Ventures: From Ideas to Enterprise and is co-authored with Professor Thomas Byers of Stanford University; the textbook is the first to thoroughly examine a global phenomenon known as "technology entrepreneurship".

== Works ==
Books authored by Dorf include:

- Technology Ventures: From Ideas to Enterprise. McGraw Hill, 2004 (1st ed), 2008 (2nd ed), 2011 (3rd ed)
- Modern Control Systems. Addison-Wesley, 1967 (1st ed.); current edition Pearson, 2016 (13th ed.)
- Computers and Man
- Pocket Book of Electrical Engineering Formulas
- Introduction to Electric Circuits
- Circuits Electrics
- The New Mutual Fund Investment Adviser
- Robotics and Automated Manufacturing

Books edited by Dorf include:

- Electrical Engineering Handbook
