= Andrzej Iwiński =

Polish sailor (1946–2020)

Personal information
- Nationality: Polish
- Born: 9 April 1946; Warsaw, Poland
- Died: 27 October 2020 (aged 74); Warsaw, Poland

Sport
- Sport: Sailing

Andrzej Iwiński (9 April 1946 – 27 October 2020) was a Polish sailor. He competed at the 1968 Summer Olympics and the 1980 Summer Olympics.
