= Anatoliy Fedorchuk =

Ukrainian politician (1959–2020)

Anatoliy Solovyovych Fedorchuk (Maly Sknit, 26 November 1959 — 28 October 2020) was a Ukrainian politician who served as mayor of Boryspil.

== Biography ==
=== Early life and education ===
Fedorchuk was born in the village of Maly Sknyt, Shepetivka Raion, Khmelnytsky region, then-Ukrainian SSR.

In 1978—1980 Fedorchuk performed his military service in the Soviet Armed Forces. In 1985 he graduated from the Kyiv Pedagogical Institute with a degree in "History, Social Sciences and Methods of Educational Work" and qualified as a teacher of history, social sciences and methodologist in educational work. From 1985 he lived in Boryspil, where he worked as a history teacher, but later began a career in law enforcement.

He served in law enforcement agencies from 1987 to 2002, when he became Head of Security Department and Deputy Personnel Director of CJSC "PentoPak" (manufacturer of sausage casings) until 2006. In 2008, he bought an apartment in an elite residential complex in Gaspra, Crimea.

=== Political career ===
Fedorchuk served as mayor of Boryspil for three different terms, each time with a different political party: from 2006 to 2010 with All-Ukrainian Union "Fatherland", from 2010 to 2015 with the Party of Regions, and from 2015 to 2020 with Our Land. He left the Party of Regions after the 2014 Ukrainian revolution.

Altogether, he was mayor of Boryspil without interruption for fourteen years, from April 2006 until his death in office in October 2020, during the COVID-19 pandemic in Ukraine.

Fedorchuk ran again at the 2020 Ukrainian local elections and won once again on 25 October, but three days later he died of COVID-19 during the COVID-19 pandemic in Ukraine, at age 60.

=== Personal life ===
He was married and had two daughters.
