= Ernie Hills =

Australia international rugby union & league player (1930–2020)

Personal information
- Full name: Ernest Fraser Hills
- Born: 3 March 1930; Ōtāhuhu, Auckland, NZ
- Died: 7 October 2020 (aged 90)

Playing information

Rugby union
- Position: wing
Representative
Years	Team	Pld	T	G	FG	P
1950	Australia	2				0

Rugby league
- Position: Wing
Club
Years	Team	Pld	T	G	FG	P
1956–57	Western Suburbs	29	19	0	0	57

Ernest Fraser "Ernie" Hills (3 March 1930 – 7 October 2020) was a rugby union, and latterly rugby league, player who represented Australia.

== Career ==
Hills, a wing, was born in Auckland, NZ and claimed a total of 2 international rugby caps for Australia in 1950. He was a junior national sprint champion in New Zealand and represented Victoria at state level. He was considered a shock selection for the national team, with the team captain and coach Trevor Allan not knowing him before he was selected in the team.

In 1951 he returned to New Zealand and enlisted to serve in the Dominion Force in the Korean War.

Later in the 1950s he played rugby league in Australia for Western Suburbs.
