= Mulayam Singh Yadav (Auraiya politician) =

Indian politician (1927–2020)

Mulayam Singh Yadav (1927 – 4 October 2020) was an Indian politician from the Samajwadi Party, who shared his name with his party's more famous founder. He was a member of the Uttar Pradesh Legislative Council (MLC) three consecutive times for Auraiya between 1990 and 2010.

== Life ==
Mulayam Singh Yadav was a native of Kakore village in Auraiya. He started his political career after being elected as the sarpanch of his village at the age of 21 in 1949 and was elected four more times. He later served as the Block pramukh between 1973 and 1988. He was a member of the Samajwadi Party. He served as a member of the Uttar Pradesh Legislative Council for Auraiya for three consecutive terms between 1990 and 2010.

Yadav died on 10 October, 2022 at the age of 92 after a prolonged illness. Getting confused with the name, some viral social media posts spread misinformation about the death of the father of Akhilesh Yadav, ex-CM Mulayam Singh Yadav. A spokesperson of the party then posted on social media to confirm that the former Chief Minister was alright.
