= Jacques Maigne =

French writer and journalist (1951–2020)

- Born: 4 April 1951; Toulouse, France
- Died: 29 October 2020 (aged 69)
- Occupation: Writer

Jacques Maigne (4 April 1951 – 29 October 2020) was a French writer and journalist.

== Biography ==
Born on 4 April 1951 in Toulouse, Maigne graduated from the Centre de formation des journalistes de Paris in 1975. He moved to Nîmes in 1977, debuting his career at La Provençal before joining the editorial staff of Sud. He was a regional correspondent, sent to the Middle East by Libération from 1986 to 1995. He then became a freelance journalist and cofounded the magazine In vino. In 1985, he received the Plume d'aigle from the Association nationale des aficionados.

Maigne wrote about Latin America, bullfighting, rugby, gastronomy, Flamenco, and popular music. He produced 12 documentaries for Arte, including one based on a novel by Antoine Blondin. He also signed the text of illustrated albums.

Jacques Maigne died from cancer of 29 October 2020 at the age of 69.

== Books ==
- L'Habit de lumière (1985)
- Guadalquivir : impressions de voyage (1990)
- À côté des taureaux (1992)
- Secrets de gardians (2002)
- Toros (2004)
- Guide des caves coopératives (2004)
- Gardon, gardons (2004)
- 18, pompiers (2005)
- De garrigues en Costières : paysages de Nîmes métropole (2005)
- Claude Viallat : un bel été (2006)
- Voir grand : panorama des grands sites (2007)
- Le Vin au fil de l'eau : les fleuves et leurs vignobles (2007)
- Site du pont du Gard : chroniques d'un aménagement (2008)
- Conversations avec Claude Viallat : ponctuées par des textes de l'artiste (2009)
- Flamenco : en flammes (2009)
- Camargue plein ciel (2013)
- Portrait de Nîmes (2015)
- Flamenco, toros y olé : « ¡Arte, coño! » (2015)
- Vigne saga (2017)
