= Deborah Cook (philosopher) =

Canadian philosopher (1954–2020)

Deborah Cook (October 12, 1954 – October 6, 2020) was a Canadian philosopher specializing in phenomenology, existentialism, critical theory, and post-structuralism. Cook was the author of several books and numerous articles, with special emphasis on the work of Theodor W. Adorno.

== Career ==
Cook received a BA and MA from the University of Ottawa. In 1985 she received a PhD (Doctorat de 3e Cycle) from the Université de Paris I-Panthéon-Sorbonne. Also at the Sorbonne she received a Diplôme d’Etudes approfondies. Cook’s PhD dissertation was on the "Phénoménologie de la Lecture du Roman" under advisor Olivier Revault d’Allonnes. While at the Sorbonne she studied with Jacques Derrida and Michel Foucault.

From 1988 to 2019 Cook was a professor at the University of Windsor, where she was the philosophy department's longest-serving faculty member.

== Adorno ==
Cook published five books and over 30 articles on the work of Frankfurt School critical theorist Theodor W. Adorno.

== Books ==
- Adorno, Foucault, and the Critique of the West (New York: Verso, 2018)
- Adorno on Nature (Stocksfield, England: Acumen Publishing Limited, 2011)
- Theodor Adorno: Key Concepts, ed. Deborah Cook (Stocksfield, England: Acumen Publishing Limited, 2008)
- Adorno, Habermas, and the Search for a Rational Society (London and New York: Routledge, 2004)
- The Culture Industry Revisited: Theodor W. Adorno on Mass Culture (Lanham, Maryland: Rowman and Littlefield, 1996)
- The Subject Finds a Voice: Foucault’s Turn Toward Subjectivity (New York: Peter Lang Publishing, Inc., 1993)
