= James G. Jones (general) =

United States Air Force general (1934–2020)

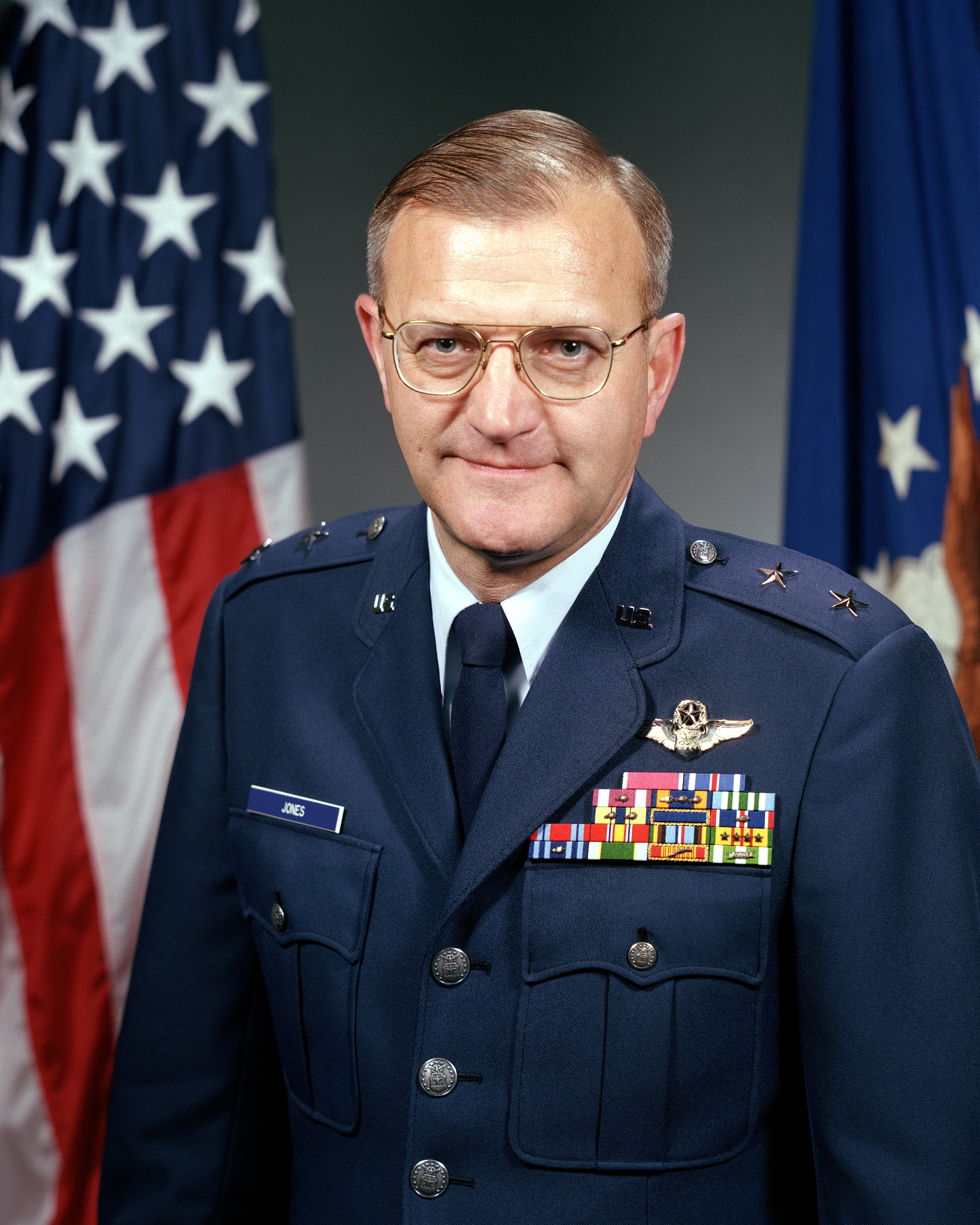
- Born: September 1, 1934; Hamilton, Ohio, US
- Died: October 21, 2020 (aged 86); Tampa, Florida, US
- Military career
- Allegiance: United States of America
- Branch: United States Air Force
- Service years: 1956-1988
- Rank: Major General
- Conflicts: Vietnam War
- Awards: Air Force Distinguished Service Medal; Legion of Merit; Distinguished Flying Cross

Major General James G. Jones (September 1, 1934 – October 21, 2020) was a United States Air Force general and commander of the Keesler Technical Training Center, Keesler Air Force Base, Mississippi.

Jones earned a bachelor of arts degree (cum laude) in mathematics from Miami University, Oxford, Ohio, in 1956 where he was a member of Phi Kappa Tau. He received a master's degree in public administration from Auburn University in 1975. General Jones was a distinguished graduate of Air Command and Staff College in 1968, and the Air War College in 1975. Both schools are located at Maxwell Air Force Base, Alabama.

He was commissioned through the Air Force Reserve Officer Training Corps program in 1956 and received his navigator wings at Harlingen Air Force Base, Texas, in September 1957.

General Jones is a master navigator with 3,000 flying hours. His military decorations and awards include the Air Force Distinguished Service Medal, Legion of Merit, Distinguished Flying Cross, Meritorious Service Medal with oak leaf cluster, Air Medal with eight oak leaf clusters, Joint Service Commendation Medal, Air Force Commendation Medal with two oak leaf clusters, Combat Readiness Medal and Armed Forces Expeditionary Medal.

- Air Force Distinguished Service Medal
- Legion of Merit
- Distinguished Flying Cross
- Meritorious Service Medal with one oak leaf cluster
- Air Medal with eight oak leaf clusters
- Joint Service Commendation Medal
- Air Force Commendation Medal with two oak leaf clusters
- Combat Readiness Medal
- Armed Forces Expeditionary Medal

He was promoted to major general on October 1, 1983, with date of rank of September 1, 1980. Jones retired from the Air Force on July 1, 1988, and died on October 21, 2020.
