= Simon Gutman =

Polish-born French Holocaust survivor (1923–2020)

- Born: Szmul Gutman; 20 July 1923; Warsaw, Second Polish Republic
- Died: 5 October 2020 (aged 97)
- Occupation: Holocaust Survivor

Simon Gutman (20 July 1923 – 5 October 2020) was a Polish-born French Holocaust survivor.

== Biography ==
Gutman was born on 20 July 1923 in Warsaw. He arrived in France with his family in 1929. He had six siblings. His father, David, born in Żelechów on 11 March 1899, was a tailor in the 10th arrondissement of Paris, working 15 hours a day. His brothers Mordka and Szrul, were born in Warsaw. His other siblings, Isaac, Chana, Yvette, and Bella were all born in Paris. Their final address in Paris was at 24 Rue Vilin. Notably, Georges Perec, writer of W, or the Memory of Childhood, lived in the same building.

Simon was deported in the 1st Convoy to Auschwitz on 27 March 1942. His brother, Mordka, was deported to Auschwitz in the 4th Convoy on 25 June 1942. His father, David, was deported to Auschwitz in the 12th Convoy on 29 July 1942. His brother, Szrul, and his sister, Chana, were deported to Auschwitz in the 15th Convoy on 5 August 1942. His brother, Isaac, and his sister, Bella, were deported to Auschwitz in the 23rd Convoy on 24 August 1942. His sister, Yvette, was deported to Auschwitz in the 77th Convoy on 31 July 1943. His mother, Cyma, and, probably, his sister, Bella, were deported to Sobibor extermination camp in March 1943, where they died.

Simon Gutman stayed at Birkenau until 26 October 1944, when he was transferred to multiple camps, including Natzweiler-Struthof concentration camp, Hailfingen, Dautmergen, and Altshausen. He escaped during a death march. On 5 April 1945, they met up with the French 2nd Armored Division in Baden-Württemberg and were liberated. When he returned to France, he only found his father. The rest of his family was murdered in the concentration camps.

After World War II, Gutman had two children: Jean-Sylvain and Irène. At the time of his death, he had eight grandchildren. In 1992, he was interviewed in the documentary Premier convoi. He died on 5 October 2020 at the age of 97.
