= Józef Zawitkowski =

Polish priest (1938–2020)

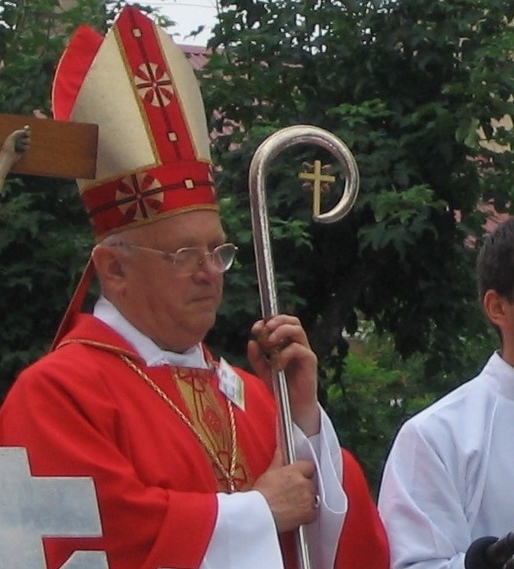

Józef Zawitkowski (23 November 1938 – 29 October 2020) was a Polish Roman Catholic bishop.

Zawitkowski was born in Poland and was ordained to the priesthood in 1962. He served as titular bishop of Ausana and auxiliary bishop of the Roman Catholic Archdiocese of Warsaw, Poland, from 1990 to 1992 and as auxiliary bishop of the Roman Catholic Diocese of Łowicz, Poland, from 1992 to 2013.
