= Arnie Bench =

Australian rules footballer (1931–2020)

Personal information
- Full name: Arnold John Bench
- Born: 14 September 1931
- Died: 1 October 2020 (aged 89)
- Original team: Queenscliff
- Height: 185 cm (6 ft 1 in)
- Weight: 87 kg (192 lb)

Playing career^{1}
Years	Club	Games (Goals)
1953–1955	Fitzroy	37 (0)
- ^{1} Playing statistics correct to the end of 1955.

Arnold John Bench (14 September 1931 – 1 October 2020) was an Australian rules footballer who played for the Fitzroy Football Club in the Victorian Football League (VFL).
