= Jean Matouk =

French economist (1937–2020)

- Born: 18 June 1937; Paris, France
- Died: 25 October 2020 (aged 83); Nîmes, France
- Occupations: Economist; Banker; Professor

Jean Robert François Matouk (18 June 1937 – 24 or 25 October 2020) was a French economist, banker, and professor of economics.

== Biography ==
Born into a Lebanese Maronite Christian family, Jean's father, Henri, was a lawyer. Jean studied at the Lycée Louis-le-Grand and obtained a diploma in physics, a doctorate in economics, and an agrégation in economics. He was a professor of economics at the University of Montpellier 1, as well as in the Netherlands and Germany. He served as President of Banque Chaix from 1982 to 1986, the Caisse nationale de l'énergie from 1988 to 1992, and the Société Marseillaise de Crédit from 1992 to 1996. Le Monde described him as a "theorist of socialist finance". He regularly spoke on Europe 1 and wrote economic columns in numerous newspapers, including L'Obs and La Tribune.

Matouk joined the Socialist Party in 1972 and became a member of its executive committee in 1979. In the 1970s, he served as a municipal councillor in Nîmes. In 1981, along with Georgina Dufoix, he helped organize the presidential campaign of François Mitterrand in Gard. He was an economic expert for the campaign. That same year, he was also a legislative candidate in Gard's 1st constituency but was defeated by Émile Jourdan.

In 2006, along with Jean-Paul Boré, Raymond Huard, and Claude Mazauric, Matouk founded the Cercle nîmois de réflexion critique, which ceased its activities in 2008. He was elected to the Académie de Nîmes in 2013 under the leadership of André Costabel. He was also affiliated with the Grand Orient de France.

In 1984, Matouk married Marie-Françoise Cazes, President of the Association culturelle et humanité. Cazes died in 2020. Jean Matouk died of COVID-19 in Nîmes sometime during the overnight hours between 24–25 October 2020, at the age of 83.

== Publications ==
- La Gauche peut sauver l'entreprise (1978)
- Le Languedoc - Roussillon et l'avenir (1979)
- Le Socialisme libéral (1987)
- Systèmes financiers comparés (1990)
- La Bourse (2000)
- Mondialisation – Altermondialisation (2005)
- L'Humanité à la croisée des chemins (2006)
- La Croissance économique en question (2009)
- L'Europe et le Destin de la démocratie (2019)

== Distinctions ==
- Officer of the Legion of Honour (2013)
