= Paul Weinberg =

Pediatric cardiologist (died 2020)

Paul Morris Weinberg
- Died: October 15, 2020
- Education: Pennsylvania State University, Jefferson Medical College
- Years active: 1969-2020
- Medical career
- Profession: Pediatric Cardiologist
- Field: Pediatric Cardiology
- Institutions: Children's Hospital of Philadelphia, University of Pennsylvania

Paul M. Weinberg was professor of pediatrics at the University of Pennsylvania School of Medicine and a pediatric cardiologist at the Children's Hospital of Philadelphia. He was internationally known for his contributions to pediatric cardiology education and the pathology of congenital heart disease.

== Early life ==
Weinberg grew up in Levittown, Pennsylvania where his family always felt he was destined to go into medicine. He was a member of the Pennsbury High School Class of 1964 in Yardley, Pennsylvania. Weinberg attended a combined undergraduate and medical school program through the Pennsylvania State University in University Park, Pennsylvania, graduating in 1967, and Jefferson Medical College in Philadelphia, Pennsylvania, graduating in 1969.

== Career ==
He completed general pediatrics residency and pediatric cardiology fellowship at the Children's Hospital of Philadelphia. He then served as a lieutenant commander and pediatric cardiologist in the United States Navy in San Diego. Upon completion of his service, he did an additional fellowship in cardiac pathology at Children's Hospital Boston and Harvard Medical School, studying under Drs. Richard Van Praagh and Stella Van Praagh.

In 1977, he returned to the University of Pennsylvania and The Children's Hospital of Philadelphia, where he worked until his retirement in 2017. He served as director of CHOP's pediatric cardiology fellowship training program from 1991 until 2015 and held national leadership roles in the Society of Pediatric Cardiology Training Program Directors and the Task Force on Clinical Competence for Paediatric Cardiology Training Guidelines. After retirement, he continued to teach cardiology fellows at The Children's Hospital of Philadelphia including delivering a video lecture from his hospital room one month before his death at age 74.

== Accomplishments ==
Weinberg was an internationally-recognized expert in cardiac pathology. He was one of the original members of the Nomenclature Working Group and then the International Society for Nomenclature of Pediatric and Congenital Heart Disease. He helped develop a consensus between the two main approaches to the nomenclature of congenital heart disease (that proposed by the Van Praaghs and himself and that proposed by Robert Anderson), which led to The International Paediatric and Congenital Cardiac Code.

=== Awards ===
- University of Pennsylvania School of Medicine Blockley-Osler Award for excellence in clinical teaching, 1998
- Jefferson Medical College Alumni Achievement Award, 2004
- University of Pennsylvania School of Medicine Robert Dunning Dripps Memorial Award for Excellence in Graduate Medical Education, 2009.
- Cardiac Center at The Children’s Hospital of Philadelphia Lifetime Achievement Award, 2011
- American College of Cardiology Distinguished Teaching Award, 2013
