= Pete Self =

American attorney and politician (1923–2020)

Member of the Alabama House of Representatives from the Marion County district
- In office 1959–1963
- Succeeded by: Rankin Fite

Personal details
- Born: April 19, 1923 Brilliant, Alabama, U.S.
- Died: October 30, 2020 (aged 97) Hoover, Alabama, U.S.
- Spouse: Ruby Weeks (m. 1942)
- Children: 3
- Education: Gulf Coast Military Academy, University of Alabama, Birmingham School of Law
- Occupation: lawyer

John D. Self, Jr. (Pete) - (April 19, 1923 – October 30, 2020) was an American attorney and politician who served as a member of the Alabama House of Representatives from 1959 to 1963. He served on the House judiciary and insurance committees.
