= Paula Menyuk =

American linguist

- Born: 1929; New York City
- Died: October 4, 2020 (aged 90–91)
- Spouse: Norman Menyuk

Academic background
- Education: Boston University

Academic work
- Institutions: School of Education, Boston University

Paula Menyuk (1929 - 2020) was an American linguist known for her research in language development and disorders. She is one of the founders of the Boston University Conference on Language Development. At the time of her death, she was Professor Emerita at Boston University.

== Biography ==
Menyuk was born in New York City and attended Hunter College High School. She received her Bachelor of Science in Speech Sciences from New York University in 1951. She worked as a chief language therapist at Massachusetts General Hospital before pursuing her Masters of Education in Speech and Hearing from Boston University. Menyuk continued on to receive her Doctor of Education in Psycholinguistics from Boston University in 1961. She completed a postdoctoral fellowship at the Massachusetts Institute of Technology, where she studied with Noam Chomsky, before returning to Boston University for the rest of her academic career.

Menyuk rose as a leading expert in child language development and disorders and eventually obtained the rank of Professor Emerita in the Developmental Studies and Applied Linguistics program at Boston University. Menyuk retired from Boston University in 1998.

Menyuk's research was supported by the National Institutes of Health, the U.S. Air Force, and the U.S. Army.

Outside of scholarly work Menyuk had a passion for safe environmental implementation.

== Research ==
Menyuk's research focused on the linguistic behavior of children and adolescents, covering topics such as the development of spoken language, prosody, metalinguistic awareness, and reading. Other work examined language development in children specifically impacted by otitis media. Menyuk's research has been described as aligning with Chomsky's theoretical perspective and centered around explaining how the faculty of language matures during childhood.

== Honors and recognition ==
Menyuk was a Fulbright Fellow in 1971 and in 1989. Menyuk received the Honors of the Association award from the American Speech-Language-Hearing Association and earned the rank of Fellow within the organization.

Boston University created the annual Paula Menyuk award in her honor to support students attending the annual Boston University Conference on Language Development (BUCLD).

== Selected publications ==
=== Books ===
- Menyuk, P. (1969). Sentences children use. MIT Press.
- Menyuk, P. (1971). The acquisition and development of language. Prentice Hall.
- Menyuk, P. (1977). Language and maturation. MIT Press.
- Menyuk, P. (1988). Language development: Knowledge and use. Addison Wesley Publishing Company.
- Menyuk, P., & Brisk, M. (2005). Language development and education: Children with varying language experiences. Springer.
- Menyuk, P., Liebergott, J. W., & Schultz, M. C. (2014). Early language development in full-term and premature infants. Psychology Press.

=== Articles ===
- Menyuk, P. (1964). Comparison of grammar of children with functionally deviant and normal speech. Journal of Speech and Hearing Research, 7(2), 109-121.
- Menyuk, P. & Chesnick, M. (1997). Metalinguistic skills, oral language knowledge and reading. Topics in Language Disorder, 17, 75-87.
- Menyuk, P., Chesnick, M., Liebergott, J. W., Korngold, B., D'Agostino, R., & Belanger, A. (1991). Predicting reading problems in at-risk children. Journal of Speech, Language, and Hearing Research, 34(4), 893-903.
- Menyuk, P., Liebergott, J., Schultz, M.. Chesnick, M., Ferrier, L. (1991). Patterns of early lexical and cognitive development in premature and full term infants. Journal of Speech, Language, and Hearing Research, 34(1), 88-94.
- Teele, D., Klein, J., Chase, C., Menyuk, P. & Rosner, B. (1990). Otitis media in infancy and development of intellectual ability, school achievement, speech and language at age seven years. Journal of Infectious Diseases, 162, 685-694.
