= Fabrice Nora =

French press executive (1951–2020)

- Born: 30 May 1951; Neuilly-sur-Seine, France
- Died: 10 October 2020 (aged 69)
- Occupation: Press Executive

Fabrice Nora (30 May 1951 – 10 October 2020) was a French press executive.

== Biography ==
Coming from a Jewish family which participated in the French Resistance, Fabrice was the son of French official Simon Nora and the nephew of historian Pierre Nora. His half-brother is editor Olivier Nora and his half-sister is journalist Dominique Nora.

Nora studied advanced technological systems at the Centre de perfectionnement aux affaires in Paris. He served as Director General of Le Nouvel Économiste from 1974 to 1982. He became publishing director of Télé Ciné Vidéo in 1984, then served as assistant to Pierre Barret, who was President of Europe 1. In 1986, Nora became deputy director of the sports journal L'Équipe, then managing director of Le Parisien from 1991 to 1998. He was responsible for printing works and labor relations of Le Parisien from 1995 to 1998 before joining the Board of Directors of Éditions Philippe Amaury. He also directed Écho Communication, Écho Voyages, Inter Hebdo, Irco, Télévision Presse Région, and L'Echo Républicain. From 1999 to 2000, he co-directed the development committee of the Syndicat de la presse quotidienne régionale. In June 2002, Nora directed the Le Monde group alongside Patrick Collard. He then became President of Éditions du Juris-Classeur.

Fabrice Nora died on 10 October 2020, at the age of 69.
