= Jérôme Gendre =

French rugby union player (died 2020)

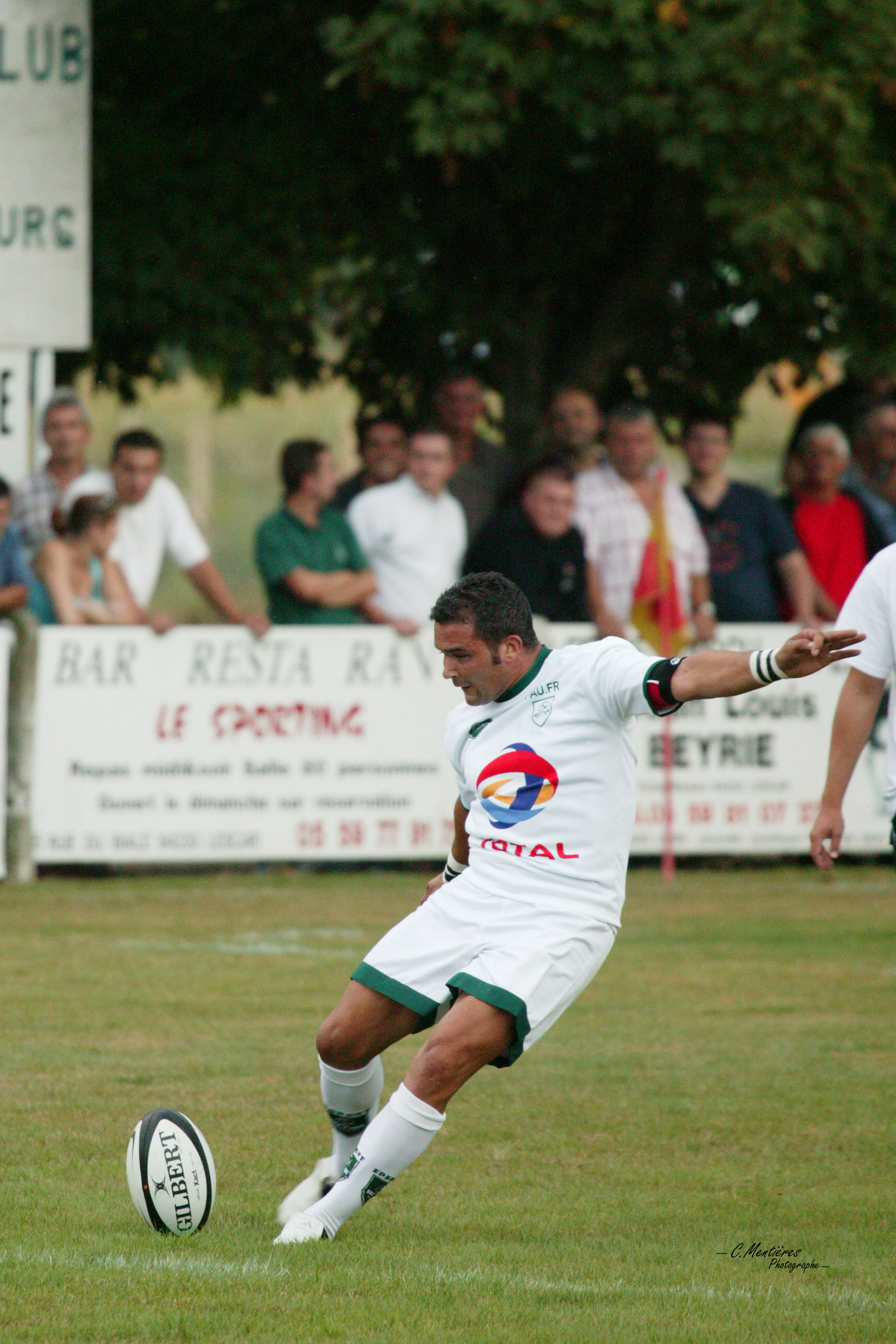
Jérôme Gendre

Jérôme Gendre (20 March 1977 – 4 October 2020) was a French rugby union player and coach. He played amongst others for RC Narbonne, Castres Olympique, ASM Clermont Auvergne and FC Auch Gers. He died aged 43 after having suffered a heart attack.
