= Karl Schütz =

Austrian music pedagogue (1936–2020)

Karl Schütz (17 April 1936 – 13 October 2020) was an Austrian music pedagogue, church musician and organ researcher.

== Career ==
Schütz was born in Vienna. He passed the teachers' examination for German and music education, and in 1964 he received his doctorate. From 1975 to 2003 he was professor for organology at the University of Music and Performing Arts Vienna. Since 1953 he has been organist at the Pfarrkirche St. Anton von Padua in Vienna.

Karl Schütz was commander in chief of the Order of the Holy Sepulchre in Vienna.

Schutz died in Vienna on 13 October 2020 at the age of 84.
