= Tous les soleils =

2011 film by Philippe Claudel

- Directed by: Philippe Claudel
- Written by: Philippe Claudel
- Produced by: Yves Marmion
- Starring: Stefano Accorsi; Neri Marcorè; Clotilde Courau; Anouk Aimée
- Cinematography: Denis Lenoir
- Edited by: Virginie Bruant
- Release date: March 30, 2011 (France)
- Running time: 105 minutes
- Country: France
- Language: French
- Budget: $8.4 million
- Box office: $4.6 million

Tous les soleils (English: All the Suns) is a 2011 French film written and directed by Philippe Claudel.

== Plot ==
Alessandro is an Italian teacher who is determined to be a good father for his teenage daughter Irina. This is impeded by Alessandro's brother Crampone who lives in the same household and who never ceased to foster revolutionary political ideas.

== Selected cast ==
- Stefano Accorsi as Alessandro
- Neri Marcorè as Luigi aka Crampone
- Clotilde Courau as Florence
- Lisa Cipriani as Irina
- Anouk Aimée as Agathe
- Philippe Rebbot as Jean-Paul
- Émilie Gavois-Kahn as The letter carrier
