= Michel Forget (aviator) =

French aviator (1927–2020)

- Born: 4 May 1927; L'Île-Bouchard, France
- Died: 1 October 2020 (aged 93)
- Occupation: Military pilot

Michel Claude André Forget (4 May 1927 – 1 October 2020) was a French military pilot.

== Biography ==
A fighter pilot, he commanded the first overseas operation by implementing modern fighter jets and leading the Force aérienne tactique for four years. He reached the rank of army corps general before becoming a Général.

Forget served as honorary chairman of Le Souvenir français in Issy-les-Molineaux. From 1985 to 1989, he was President of the Association des anciens élèves de l'École de l'air. He died on 1 October 2020.

== Distinctions ==
- Grand Cross of the Legion of Honour (2001)
- Member of the Council of the National Order of the Legion of Honour
- Correspondent of the Académie des Sciences Morales et Politiques, elected on 26 October 1998 to replace Nicolas Wahl
- National Vice-President of the Council of Administration of Le Souvenir français

== Works ==
- Puissance aérienne et stratégies (2001)
- Guerre froide et Guerre d'Algérie : 1954-1964, témoignage sur une période agitée (2002)
- Notre défense dans un monde en crise : de 1960 à nos jours (2006)
- Du Vampire au Mirage : l'épopée d'une génération de pilotes de chasse (2007)
- Nos forces aériennes en OPEX : un demi-siècle d'interventions extérieures (2013)
- Nos armées au temps de la Ve République (2016)
