= Pierre Jourdan (politician) =

French politician (1923–2020)

General Councillor of the Canton de Saint-Étienne-de-Lugdarès
- In office 24 April 1955 – October 1980

Mayor of Saint-Étienne-de-Lugdarès
- In office 15 March 1959 – October 1980
- Preceded by: Jean Brunel
- Succeeded by: Gilbert Mourgue

French Senator from Ardèche
- In office 26 September 1971 – 1 October 1980

Personal details
- Born: 23 June 1923 Montpellier, France
- Died: 21 October 2020 (aged 97)
- Party: CNIP; RI; UDF

Pierre Jourdan (23 June 1923 – 21 October 2020) was a French politician.

He was a Senator (1971–1980) and the mayor of Saint-Étienne-de-Lugdarès (1959–1980).
