= 2020 in music =

This topic covers notable events and articles related to 2020 in music.

== Specific locations ==
- African music
- American music
- Asian music
- Australian music
- Brazilian music
- British music
- Canadian music
- Chinese music
- Czech music
- Danish music
- European music
- Finnish music
- French music
- German music
- Icelandic music
- Indian music
- Indonesian music
- Irish music
- Japanese music
- Latin music
- Malaysian music
- Mongolian music
- Norwegian music
- Philippine music
- Polynesian music
- Scandinavian music
- South Korean music
- Swedish music
- Taiwanese music
- Vietnamese music

== Specific genres ==
- Classical
- Country
- Electronic
- Jazz
- Latin
- Heavy metal
- Hip-hop
- Progressive rock
- Rock
- K-pop
- J-pop

== Awards ==
62nd Annual Grammy Awards (USA)
Record of the Year: "Bad Guy" by Billie Eilish • Album of the Year: When We All Fall Asleep, Where Do We Go? by Billie Eilish • Song of the Year: "Bad Guy" by Billie Eilish • Best New Artist: Billie Eilish
Billboard Music Awards (USA)
Top Artist: Post Malone • Top Male Artist: Post Malone • Top Female Artist: Billie Eilish • Top New Artist: Billie Eilish • Top Duo/Group: Jonas Brothers • Top Billboard 200 Album: When We All Fall Asleep, Where Do We Go? by Billie Eilish • Top Hot 100 Song: "Old Town Road" by Lil Nas X Featuring Billy Ray Cyrus
2020 Brit Awards (UK)
British Album of the Year: Psychodrama by Dave • Song of the Year: "Someone You Loved" by Lewis Capaldi • Best New Artist: Lewis Capaldi
2020 Juno Awards (Canada)
Artist of the Year: Shawn Mendes • Group of the Year: Loud Luxury • Album of the Year: The Pains of Growing by Alessia Cara • Single of the Year: "Senorita" by Shawn Mendes and Camila Cabello
2020 MTV Video Music Awards (USA)
Video of the Year: "Blinding Lights" by The Weeknd • Best Push New Artist: Doja Cat • Artist of the Year: Lady Gaga
2020 MTV Europe Music Awards (Europe)
Best Song: "Dynamite" by BTS • Best Video: "Popstar" by DJ Khaled featuring Drake • Best Artist: Lady Gaga • Best New: Doja Cat
2020 American Music Awards (USA)
Artist of the Year: Taylor Swift • New Artist of the Year: Doja Cat • Collaboration of the Year: "10,000 Hours" by Dan + Shay and Justin Bieber
2020 Pulitzer Prize for Music (USA)
The Central Park Five by Anthony Davis
Rock and Roll Hall of Fame (USA)
Inductees: The Doobie Brothers • Whitney Houston • Depeche Mode • T. Rex • The Notorious B.I.G. • Nine Inch Nails
Mercury Prize (UK)
Kiwanuka by Michael Kiwanuka
Polar Music Prize (Sweden)
Inductees: Anna Netrebko • Diane Warren
Polaris Music Prize (Canada)
God Has Nothing to Do With This Leave Him Out of It by Backxwash
Eurovision Song Contest (Europe)
Event cancelled as result of COVID-19 pandemic
29th Seoul Music Awards (South Korea)
Grand Award: BTS • Best Song: Taeyeon • Best Album: BTS • Best New Artist: Itzy, Tomorrow X Together, AB6IX

== Bands formed ==
- 1st.One
- Aespa
- All at Once
- Arcana Project
- BAE173
- Blackswan
- BonBon Girls 303
- B.O.Y
- Botopass
- BtoB 4U
- Chō Tokimeki Sendenbu
- Cignature
- Citi Zēni
- Cobra Spell
- Cravity
- DKB
- Dolla
- Drippin
- E'Last
- English Teacher
- Enhypen
- Ghost9
- Go to the Beds
- H&D
- JO1
- Liquid Mike
- L.S. Dunes
- The Lucid
- Lucy
- Lunarsolar
- MCND
- Militarie Gun
- Morfonica
- Nemophila
- NewDad
- NiziU
- Orbit
- Paradises
- Piggs
- P1Harmony
- Porij
- Redsquare
- Red Velvet - Irene & Seulgi
- Refund Sisters
- Sakurazaka46
- Secret Number
- SixTones
- Snow Man
- Softcult
- SSAK3
- STAYC
- TO1
- Treasure
- UNVS
- Weeekly
- WEi
- Woo!ah!
- WJSN Chocome
- Zamb

== Soloist debuts ==
- Ado
- Ai Furihata
- Aina Suzuki
- Akane Kumada
- Alexa Ilacad
- Amee
- Anson Kong
- Anson Lo
- April Lawlor
- Ashton Irwin
- Azumi Waki
- Bang Ye-dam
- Central Cee
- Curley Gao
- Dixie
- Denis Stoff
- Elio
- Emma Heesters
- Emman
- Fujii Kaze
- Gakuto Kajiwara
- Han Seung-woo
- Haruka Kudō
- Hayley Williams
- Heo Chan-mi
- Hikaru
- Holly Humberstone
- Hoshimachi Suisei
- Ivana Alawi
- Jamie Miller
- Jer Lau
- Jxdn
- Kai
- Karin Miyamoto
- Keiko
- Ken
- Kim Nam-joo
- Kim Woo-seok
- Koutaro Nishiyama
- Laufey
- Lee Eun-sang
- Lee Su-hyun
- Lilas Ikuta
- Liyuu
- Maine Mendoza
- Max
- Miki Satō
- Mimiyuuuh
- Mimi Webb
- MindaRyn
- Moon Jong-up
- Nanaka Suwa
- Nana Mori
- Natty
- Nessa Barrett
- Ong Seong-wu
- Reina Washio
- Riho Sayashi
- Ryota Katayose
- Ryu Su-jeong
- Rubi Rose
- Sae Ōtsuka
- Sangiovanni
- Seo Eun-kwang
- Serri
- Solar
- Suho
- Takuya Kimura
- Tomori Kusunoki
- Win Morisaki
- Wonho
- YooA
- Yook Sung-jae
- Yoon Doo-joon
- Yui Ninomiya
- Yuki Nakashima
- Yurina Hirate
- Zild

== Bands reformed ==
- attack attack!
- Destroy Rebuild Until God Shows
- Faith No More
- The Format
- Genesis
- Linkin Park
- The Network
- Rage Against the Machine
- RBD
- Toto
- Billy Pilgrim

== Bands on hiatus ==
- 100%
- AAA
- Anathema
- Arashi
- B.A.P
- Baroque
- College Cosmos
- DEL48
- Good Morning America
- Ladies' Code
- Ladybaby
- Masahiko Kondō
- Marius Yo
- Mrs. Green Apple
- Real Friends
- Teen Top
- Sleep
- Shoreline Mafia
- Stone Sour
- Winner
- ZE:A

== Bands disbanded ==
- 1the9
- Babes in Toyland
- Badkiz
- Bay City Rollers
- Black Dresses
- Carry Loose
- Columbia University Marching Band
- Default
- E-girls
- Fairies
- Gang of Four
- Group Tamashii
- Gugudan
- Hachimitsu Rocket
- Hinapia
- Household Gods
- Joan of Arc
- Madvillain
- Magnolia Factory
- Masc
- Mission of Burma
- Nachtmystium
- NeonPunch
- obey the brave
- Party Rockets GT
- PrizmaX
- Psychic TV
- Red Sun Rising
- She Wants Revenge
- Spectrum
- Sora tob sakana
- SudannaYuzuYully
- The Spencer Davis Group
- SSAK3
- SHVPES
- Tegomass
- Uijin
- Van Halen
- X1
- YBN

== Deaths ==
=== January ===
- 1
  - Lexii Alijai, 21, American rapper
  - Marty Grebb, 74, American rock keyboardist and multi-instrumentalist (The Buckinghams, Chicago)
  - Tommy Hancock, 90, American country singer
- 2 – Lorraine Chandler, 73, American soul singer
- 3 – Bo Winberg, 80, Swedish rock guitarist (The Spotnicks)
- 4 – Emanuel Borok, 75, Russian-born American classical violinist
- 5 – Martin Griffin, British space rock drummer (Hawkwind, Hawklords)
- 7 – Neil Peart, 67, Canadian progressive rock drummer and lyricist (Rush)
- 8 – Edd Byrnes, 87, American actor and pop singer
- 9
  - Tom Alexander, 85, Scottish folk accordionist (The Alexander Brothers)
  - Bobby Comstock, 78, American rock and roll singer
- 10 – Wolfgang Dauner, 84, German jazz pianist
- 11 – Maceo Woods, 87, American gospel musician
- 13
  - Demetri Callas, 77, American rock guitarist and singer (The Four Seasons)
  - Hylda Sims, 87, British skiffle guitarist
- 14
  - Steve Martin Caro, 71, American baroque pop singer (The Left Banke)
  - Chamín Correa, 90, Mexican classical guitarist
  - Guy Deplus, 95, French chamber music clarinetist
  - Barry Mayger, 73, English pop bassist (Chicory Tip)
  - Bruno Nettl, 89, Czech-born American ethnomusicologist and musicologist
- 15 – Chris Darrow, 75, American country and rock singer and multi-instrumentalist (Kaleidoscope, Nitty Gritty Dirt Band)
- 18
  - Dennis Garcia, 67, Filipino pop rock bassist (Hotdog)
  - David Olney, 71, American folk singer-songwriter
- 19
  - Dan Andrei Aldea, 69, Romanian progressive rock singer and multi-instrumentalist (Sfinx)
  - Jimmy Heath, 93, American jazz saxophonist (Heath Brothers)
  - Robert Parker, 89, American R&B singer
  - Sunanda Patnaik, 85, Indian classical singer
- 21 – Meritxell Negre, 48, Spanish pop singer (Peaches & Herb)
- 24
  - Joe Payne, 35, American metal bassist (Divine Heresy, Nile)
  - Sean Reinert, 48, American metal drummer (Cynic, Death, Æon Spoke)
- 25
  - Bob Gullotti, 71, American free jazz drummer (Surrender to the Air)
  - Vernon Sandusky, 80, American rock singer and guitarist (The Chartbusters)
- 26 – Bob Shane, 85, American folk singer and guitarist (The Kingston Trio)
- 27 – Reed Mullin, 53, American sludge metal drummer (Corrosion of Conformity)
- 28 – Bob Nave, 75, American bubblegum pop keyboardist (The Lemon Pipers)
- 30 – Lucien Barbarin, 63, American jazz trombonist (Preservation Hall Jazz Band, Harry Connick Jr.)

=== February ===
- 1
  - Harold Beane, 73, American funk guitarist (Funkadelic)
  - Andy Gill, 64, British post-punk guitarist (Gang of Four)
  - Peter Serkin, 72, American classical pianist
- 2
  - Kofi B, Ghanaian highlife singer
  - Ivan Král, 71, Czech-American rock bassist and songwriter (The Patti Smith Group)
- 4
  - Andrew Brough, New Zealand indie rock singer, songwriter, and guitarist (Straitjacket Fits)
  - Buddy Cage, 73, Canadian folk pedal steel guitarist (New Riders of the Purple Sage, Great Speckled Bird)
  - Ljiljana Petrović, 80, Serbian pop singer
- 6
  - Lynn Evans, 95, American pop singer (The Chordettes)
  - Diego Farias, 27, American progressive metalcore guitarist (Volumes)
  - Nello Santi, 88, Italian classical conductor
- 7
  - Nexhmije Pagarusha, 86, Albanian-Kosovan pop singer
  - Steve Weber, 76, American folk singer and guitarist (The Holy Modal Rounders)
- 8 – Robert Conrad, 84, American actor and singer
- 9 – Sergei Slonimsky, 87, Russian classical composer
- 10 – Lyle Mays, 66, American jazz fusion keyboardist (Pat Metheny Group)
- 11 – Joseph Shabalala, 78, South African isicathamiya and mbube singer (Ladysmith Black Mambazo)
- 12
  - Paul English, 87, American country drummer
  - Victor Olaiya, 89, Nigerian highlife trumpeter
- 13
  - Buzzy Linhart, 76, American folk rock singer-songwriter
  - Jacob Thiele, 40, American indie rock keyboardist (The Faint)
- 14
  - Reinbert de Leeuw, 81, Dutch classical pianist and conductor
  - Sonam Sherpa, 48, Indian blues rock guitarist (Parikrama)
- 15 – Cavan Grogan, 70, Welsh rock and roll singer (Crazy Cavan and the Rhythm Rockers)
- 16
  - Pearl Carr, 98, British pop singer (Pearl Carr & Teddy Johnson)
  - Graeme Allwright, 93, New Zealand-French folk and jazz singer-songwriter
- 17
  - Kizito Mihigo, 38, Rwandan gospel singer
  - Andrew Weatherall, 56, British electronic musician (Two Lone Swordsmen, The Sabres of Paradise) and record producer
- 18 – Jon Christensen, 78, Norwegian jazz drummer
- 19
  - Bob Cobert, 95, American composer
  - Pop Smoke, 20, American rapper
- 24
  - David Roback, 61, American alternative rock and dream pop guitarist (Mazzy Star, Rain Parade, Opal)
  - Jahn Teigen, 70, Norwegian pop and progressive rock singer (Popol Ace, Prima Vera)
- 26
  - Hans Deinzer, 86, German classical clarinetist
  - Sergei Dorensky, 88, Russian classical pianist
- 27 – Lillian Offitt, 81, American blues and R&B singer
- 28 – Mike Somerville, 67, American rock guitarist and songwriter (Head East)
- 29
  - Odile Pierre, 87, French classical organist and composer
  - Bill Smith, 93, American classical and jazz clarinetist

=== March ===
- 2
  - Jan Vyčítal, 77, Czech country singer
  - Susan Weinert, 54, German jazz fusion guitarist
  - Peter Wieland, 89, German pop singer
- 3
  - Les Cauchi, 77, American pop singer (Johnny Maestro & the Brooklyn Bridge)
  - Alf Cranner, 83, Norwegian folk singer
- 4 – Barbara Martin, 76, American R&B singer (The Supremes)
- 6
  - McCoy Tyner, 81, American jazz pianist
  - Elinor Ross, 93, American opera soprano
- 7
  - Jim Owen, 78, American country singer-songwriter
  - Laura Smith, Canadian folk singer-songwriter
- 9
  - Keith Olsen, 74, American psychedelic rock bassist (The Music Machine) and record producer
  - Eric Taylor, 70, American folk singer-songwriter
- 10
  - Marcelo Peralta, 59, Argentine jazz saxophonist
  - Beba Selimović, 80, Bosnian folk singer
- 11 – Charles Wuorinen, 81, American classical composer
- 12 – Don Burrows, 91, Australian jazz multi-instrumentalist
- 14
  - Phil Phillips, 94, American pop singer-songwriter
  - Eva Pilarová, 80, Czech jazz singer
  - Genesis P-Orridge, 70, British industrial singer, songwriter and bassist (Throbbing Gristle, Psychic TV, Thee Majesty)
  - Diane Ray, 74, American pop singer
- 16
  - Sergio Bassi, 69, Italian folk rock singer-songwriter
  - Ted Cahill, 72, American garage rock guitarist (The Magic Mushrooms)
  - Jason Rainey, 53, American thrash metal guitarist (Sacred Reich)
- 17 – Thái Thanh, 85, Vietnamese-American pop singer
- 19 – Aurlus Mabélé, 66, Congolese soukous singer
- 20
  - Kenny Rogers, 81, American country and pop singer-songwriter
  - Jerry Slick, 80, American psychedelic rock drummer (The Great Society)
- 21 – Hellmut Stern, 91, German classical violinist
- 22
  - Gabi Delgado-López, 61, Spanish-born German electronic singer (Deutsch Amerikanische Freundschaft)
  - Julie Felix, 81, American-British folk singer
  - Mike Longo, 83, American jazz pianist
  - Peter Stapleton, 65, New Zealand alternative rock drummer (The Terminals, Dadamah, Flies Inside the Sun)
  - Eric Weissberg, 80, American country and bluegrass banjoist
- 23 – Tres Warren, 41, American psychedelic rock singer and guitarist (Psychic Ills)
- 24
  - Manu Dibango, 86, Cameroonian makossa and jazz saxophonist
  - Bill Rieflin, 59, American rock drummer (The Blackouts, Ministry, Revolting Cocks, KMFDM, King Crimson)
- 25 – Detto Mariano, 82, Italian rock keyboardist (I Ribelli) and film composer
- 26
  - Olle Holmquist, 83, Swedish big band trombonist (James Last Orchestra)
  - Bill Martin, 81, British pop songwriter
- 27
  - Bob Andy, 75, Jamaican reggae singer-songwriter (The Paragons, Bob and Marcia)
  - Don Burch, 81, American doo-wop singer (The Slades)
  - Mirna Doris, 79, Italian canzone Napoletana singer
  - Delroy Washington, 67, Jamaican-born British reggae singer
- 28 – Jan Howard, 91, American country singer-songwriter
- 29
  - Joe Diffie, 61, American country singer and songwriter
  - Alan Merrill, 69, American pop rock singer and bassist (Arrows)
  - Paravai Muniyamma, 82, Indian folk singer
  - Krzysztof Penderecki, 86, Polish classical composer and conductor
- 30
  - Riachão, 98, Brazilian samba singer
  - Bill Withers, 81, American soul singer-songwriter
- 31
  - Cristina, 61, American new wave singer
  - Wallace Roney, 59, American jazz trumpeter

=== April ===
- 1
  - Ellis Marsalis Jr., 85, American jazz pianist
  - Bucky Pizzarelli, 94, American jazz guitarist
  - Harold Rubin, 87, South African-born Israeli free jazz clarinetist
  - Adam Schlesinger, 52, American power pop singer, songwriter and bassist (Fountains of Wayne, Ivy, Tinted Windows)
- 2 – Vaughan Mason, 69, American funk and electronic multi-instrumentalist (Vaughan Mason & Crew, Raze)
- 3 – Helin Bölek, 28, Turkish folk rock singer (Grup Yorum)
- 4
  - Timothy Brown, 82, American pop and soul singer
  - Patrick Gibson, French eurodisco drummer (Gibson Brothers)
  - Alex Harvey, 73, American country singer-songwriter
- 5 – Barry Allen, 74, Canadian rock musician and record producer (Painter) (death announced on this date)
- 6
  - M. K. Arjunan, 84, Indian film composer
  - Black the Ripper, 32, British grime rapper
- 7
  - Betty Bennett, 98, American jazz and big band singer
  - Hutch Davie, 89, American pianist, arranger and composer
  - Steve Farmer, 71, American rock guitarist and songwriter (The Amboy Dukes)
  - Travis Nelsen, American indie rock drummer (Okkervil River)
  - John Prine, 73, American folk singer-songwriter
  - Hal Willner, 64, American record producer
  - Xudeydi, 91, Somali folk oud player
- 8
  - Carl Dobkins, Jr., 79, American singer and songwriter
  - Glenn Fredly, 44, Indonesian R&B singer-songwriter
  - Chynna Rogers, 25, American rapper
- 9
  - Andy González, 69, American Latin jazz bassist
  - Dmitri Smirnov, 71, Russian-British classical composer
- 10
  - Big George Brock, 87, American blues harmonicist
  - Shanti Hiranand, 86, Indian classical singer
  - Jymie Merritt, 92, American jazz bassist (The Jazz Messengers)
- 11 – Liu Dehai, 82, Chinese classical pipa player
- 12
  - Jerry Hludzik, American pop rock guitarist and bassist (The Buoys)
  - Louis van Dijk, 78, Dutch jazz pianist
- 13
  - Ryo Kawasaki, 73, Japanese jazz fusion guitarist
  - Moraes Moreira, 72, Brazilian MPB singer and guitarist (Novos Baianos)
- 14
  - Akin Euba, 84, Nigerian folk pianist, composer, and musicologist
  - Kassongo Wa Kanema, 73, Congolese soukous singer (Orchestra Super Mazembe)
  - Kerstin Meyer, 92, Swedish opera singer
- 15
  - Henry Grimes, 84, American jazz bassist
  - Dries Holten, 84, Dutch pop singer-songwriter (Rosy & Andres)
  - Lee Konitz, 92, American jazz saxophonist
  - Gary McSpadden, 77, American gospel singer (The Imperials, Gaither Vocal Band, The Oak Ridge Boys)
- 16
  - Christophe, 74, French singer-songwriter
  - Dušan Vančura, 82, Czech folk singer and bassist (Spirituál kvintet)
- 17
  - Giuseppi Logan, 84, American jazz multi-instrumentalist
  - Matthew Seligman, 62, British new wave bassist (Bruce Woolley and the Camera Club, The Soft Boys, Thompson Twins)
- 19
  - Alexander Vustin, 76, Russian composer
  - Ian Whitcomb, 78, British pop singer-songwriter
  - Emina Zečaj, 91, Bosnian sevdalinka singer
- 21
  - Derek Jones, 35, American metalcore guitarist (Falling in Reverse)
  - Jacques Pellen, 63, French jazz guitarist
  - Florian Schneider, 73, German krautrock and electronic multi-instrumentalist (Kraftwerk, Organisation)
- 22
  - Bootsie Barnes, 82, American jazz saxophonist
  - Marcos Mundstock, 77, Argentine comedy music singer and multi-instrumentalist (Les Luthiers)
- 23
  - Fred the Godson, 35, American rapper
  - Kamit Sanbayev, 78, Kazakh rock singer (Dos Mukasan)
- 24
  - Hamilton Bohannon, 78, American R&B and disco percussionist and music producer
  - Phil Broadhurst, 70, New Zealand jazz pianist
  - Harold Reid, 80, American country singer-songwriter (The Statler Brothers)
- 25
  - Alan Abel, 91, American classical percussionist
  - Ronald Frangipane, 75, American session keyboardist (The Archies)
- 26 – Big Al Carson, 66, American blues singer
- 27
  - Lynn Harrell, 79, American classical cellist
  - Troy Sneed, 52, American gospel singer
  - Scott Taylor, British new wave guitarist (Then Jerico)
- 28 – Bobby Lewis, 95, American R&B singer
- 29
  - Martin Lovett, 93, British classical cellist (Amadeus Quartet)
  - Stezo, 52, American rapper
- 30
  - Tony Allen, 79, Nigerian afrobeat and rock drummer (Fela Kuti and Afrika '70, The Good, the Bad & the Queen)
  - Óscar Chávez, 85, Mexican pop singer
  - Sam Lloyd, 56, American a cappella singer (The Blanks)

==== Date unknown ====
- Ceybil Jefferies, American house and R&B singer

=== May ===
- 1
  - Richard Cole, 72, American jazz saxophonist
  - Tavo Limongi, 52, Mexican nu metal guitarist (Resorte)
- 2
  - Cady Groves, 30, American country singer-songwriter
  - Idir, 70, Algerian folk singer-songwriter
  - Jonathan Kelly, 72, Irish folk rock singer-songwriter
  - Erwin Prasetya, 48, Indonesian alternative rock bassist (Dewa 19)
- 3
  - Rosalind Elias, 90, American opera singer
  - Dave Greenfield, 71, British punk and new wave keyboardist (The Stranglers)
  - Bob Lander, 78, Swedish rock singer and guitarist (The Spotnicks)
  - Lorne Munroe, 95, Canadian-born American classical cellist
- 4
  - John Erhardt, American indie rock musician (Wussy, Ass Ponys)
  - Frederick C. Tillis, 90, American jazz saxophonist
  - Dragan Vučić, 65, Macedonian pop singer
- 5
  - Sweet Pea Atkinson, 74, American dance-rock singer (Was (Not Was))
  - Sonny Cox, 82, American jazz saxophonist
  - Didi Kempot, 53, Indonesian campursari singer
  - Ciro Pessoa, 62, Brazilian post-punk singer-songwriter and guitarist (Titãs, Cabine C)
  - Kiing Shooter, 24, American rapper
  - Millie Small, 73, Jamaican ska and reggae singer-songwriter
- 6
  - Norbert Balatsch, 92, Austrian choral conductor
  - Brian Howe, 66, British rock singer-songwriter (Bad Company)
- 7
  - İbrahim Gökçek, 41, Turkish folk rock bassist (Grup Yorum)
  - Andre Harrell, 59, American record producer, songwriter, rapper (Dr. Jeckyll & Mr. Hyde), and founder of Uptown Records
  - Ty, 47, British rapper
- 8 – Mark Barkan, 85, American songwriter, record producer, and musical director for The Banana Splits Adventure Hour
- 9
  - Joe Hupp, 78, American rock musician (The Smoke Ring)
  - Little Richard, 87, American rock and roll singer and pianist
- 10
  - David Corrêa, 82, Brazilian samba singer
  - Betty Wright, 66, American soul and R&B singer and songwriter
- 11 – Moon Martin, 74, American rockabilly singer-songwriter and guitarist
- 12 – Takami Asano, Japanese psychedelic rock guitarist (Godiego)
- 13
  - Gabriel Bacquier, 95, French opera singer
  - Yoshio, 60, Mexican pop singer
- 14 – Jorge Santana, 68, Mexican rock guitarist (Malo, Santana)
- 15
  - Denny DeMarchi, 57, Canadian rock keyboardist (Alias, The Cranberries)
  - Sergio Denis, 71, Argentine pop singer
  - Phil May, 75, British rock singer-songwriter (Pretty Things)
- 17
  - Lucky Peterson, 55, American blues singer, guitarist and organist
  - Peter Thomas, 94, German film composer
- 19 – Willie K, 59, American folk ukuleleist
- 21
  - Berith Bohm, 87, Swedish opera singer
  - Bobby Digital, 59, Jamaican dancehall producer
  - Neil Howlett, 85, British opera singer
- 22
  - Steve Hanford, 50, American punk rock drummer (Poison Idea)
  - Mory Kanté, 70, Guinean folk singer and kora player
  - KJ Balla, 23, American rapper
  - Klaus Selmke, 70, German rock drummer (City)
- 24
  - Jimmy Cobb, 91, American jazz drummer (Miles Davis Quintet)
  - Lily Lian, 103, French pop singer
  - Al Rex, 91, American rock and roll bassist (Bill Haley & His Comets)
- 25 – Bucky Baxter, 65, American folk and rock guitarist
- 26
  - Brendan Bowyer, 81, Irish rock and roll singer
  - Charlie Monttana, 58, Mexican rock singer
  - Lennie Niehaus, 90, American jazz saxophonist and film composer
- 27 – Evaldo Gouveia, 91, Brazilian MPB singer
- 28 – Bob Kulick, 70, American hard rock guitarist (Balance, Kiss, W.A.S.P.)
- 30
  - Mady Mesplé, 89, French opera singer
  - John Nzenze, 79–80, Kenyan rock and jazz guitarist
- 31
  - Bob Northern, 86, American jazz French hornist
  - Kjeld Wennick, 76, Danish banjoist and singer (Jan & Kjeld)

=== June ===
- 1
  - Majek Fashek, 57, Nigerian reggae singer and songwriter
  - Joey Image, 63, American punk rock drummer (Misfits)
- 2 – Chris Trousdale, 34, American pop singer (Dream Street)
- 4
  - Marcello Abbado, 93, Italian classical pianist and composer
  - Rupert Hine, 72, British jazz-rock singer and keyboardist (Quantum Jump)
  - Steve Priest, 72, British glam rock guitarist (The Sweet)
- 5 – Marjan, 72, Iranian pop singer
- 7
  - Frank Bey, 74, American blues singer
  - Floyd Lee, 86, American blues singer and guitarist
- 8
  - James Hand, 67, American country singer
  - Bonnie Pointer, 69, American R&B singer (The Pointer Sisters)
- 9
  - Paul Chapman, 66, Welsh hard rock guitarist (UFO, Lone Star)
  - Pau Donés, 53, Spanish pop rock singer-songwriter and guitarist (Jarabe de Palo)
- 12
  - Dodo Doris, 71, Congolese soukous drummer (Orchestra Super Mazembe)
  - Ricky Valance, 84, Welsh pop singer
- 14
  - Keith Tippett, 72, British free jazz and progressive rock pianist (King Crimson, Centipede)
- 15
  - Rocky Isaac, 73, American pop-rock drummer (The Cherry People)
  - Nana Tuffour, 66, Ghanaian highlife singer
- 16 – Yohan, 28, South Korean K-pop singer (TST)
- 17 – Hugh Fraser, 67, Canadian jazz pianist and trombonist
- 18
  - Hux Brown, 75, Jamaican reggae guitarist (Toots and the Maytals)
  - Vera Lynn, 103, British pop singer
- 19 – A. L. Raghavan, 86, Indian playback singer
- 20 – Aaron Tokona, 45, New Zealand alternative rock guitarist (Weta, Cairo Knife Fight, Fly My Pretties)
- 21
  - Jeet Singh Negi, 95, Indian folk singer-songwriter
  - Joan Pau Verdier, 73, French nòva cançon singer
- 23 – Margarita Pracatan, 89, Cuban novelty singer
- 24
  - Michael Hawley, 58, American classical pianist and academic
  - Claude Le Péron, 72, French rock bassist
- 25
  - Huey, 32, American rapper
  - Graeme Williamson, Canadian new wave singer and guitarist (Pukka Orchestra)
- 26 – Tami Lynn, 81, American soul singer
- 27
  - Pete Carr, 70, American rock, pop and soul guitarist (Muscle Shoals Rhythm Section, Hour Glass, LeBlanc & Carr)
  - Freddy Cole, 88, American jazz singer and pianist
  - Tom Finn, 71, American baroque pop guitarist (The Left Banke)
  - Mats Rådberg, 72, Swedish country singer and guitarist
- 28 – Simon H. Fell, 61, British jazz bassist
- 29
  - Steppa J. Groggs, 32, American rapper (Injury Reserve)
  - Johnny Mandel, 94, American jazz and film composer
  - Benny Mardones, 73, American soft rock singer-songwriter
  - Willie Wright, 80, American soul singer

=== July ===
- 1
  - Max Crook, 83, American pop rock keyboardist
  - Joe Penny, 92, American country music singer
- 3 – J. Marvin Brown, 66, American soul singer (The Softones)
- 5
  - Cleveland Eaton, 80, American jazz bassist (Ramsey Lewis Trio)
  - John Marascalco, 89, American songwriter and record producer
- 6
  - Charlie Daniels, 83, American country singer-songwriter and fiddler
  - Andrew Kishore, 64, Bangladeshi playback singer
  - Ennio Morricone, 91, Italian film composer
- 8 – Naya Rivera, 33, American pop singer and actress
- 10 – Eddie Gale, 78, American jazz trumpeter (Sun Ra's Arkestra)
- 11
  - Gabriella Tucci, 90, Italian opera singer
  - Rich Priske, 52, Canadian rock bassist (Matthew Good Band)
- 12
  - Rod Bernard, 79, American swamp pop singer
  - Judy Dyble, 71, British folk singer-songwriter and autoharpist (Fairport Convention, Trader Horne)
  - Eleanor Sokoloff, 106, American classical pianist
- 14
  - J. J. Lionel, 72, Belgian pop singer
  - Raúl Pagano, Argentine rock keyboardist (Bersuit Vergarabat)
- 16
  - Ken Chinn, 57, Canadian punk rock singer (SNFU)
  - Jamie Oldaker, 68, American country drummer (The Tractors)
  - Víctor Víctor, 71, Dominican folk singer and guitarist
- 18 – Haruma Miura, 30, Japanese pop singer and actor
- 19 – Emitt Rhodes, 70, American pop rock singer-songwriter and multi-instrumentalist (The Merry-Go-Round, The Palace Guard)
- 21
  - Dobby Dobson, 77, Jamaican reggae singer
  - Annie Ross, 89, British-American jazz singer (Lambert, Hendricks & Ross)
  - Mieko Hirota, 73, Japanese kayokyoku singer
- 22 – Tim Smith, 59, British progressive rock singer and guitarist (Cardiacs, The Sea Nymphs, Spratleys Japs)
- 24 – Regis Philbin, 88, American television personality and singer
- 25
  - Peter Green, 73, English blues rock singer-songwriter and guitarist (Fleetwood Mac)
  - CP Lee, 70, British comedy rock singer and guitarist (Alberto y Lost Trios Paranoias)
- 27
  - Denise Johnson, 56, British alternative rock singer (Primal Scream)
  - Miss Mercy, 71, American psychedelic rock singer (The GTOs)
- 28
  - Pepe Cardona, 72, American pop-rock singer (Alive 'N Kickin')
  - Bent Fabric, 95, Danish classical pianist and composer
- 29
  - Balla Sidibé, 79, Senegalese son cubano singer and timbalero (Orchestra Baobab)
  - Malik B., 47, American rapper (The Roots)
- 30
  - Randy Barlow, 77, American country singer
  - Sonam Tshering Lepcha, 92, Indian folk singer
- 31 – Bill Mack, 88, American country singer-songwriter

=== August ===
- 2
  - Leon Fleisher, 92, American classical pianist
  - Steve Holland, 66, American Southern rock guitarist (Molly Hatchet, Gator Country)
  - Larry Novak, 87, American jazz pianist
- 4
  - Tony Costanza, 52, American heavy metal drummer (Machine Head, Crowbar)
- 5
  - Agathonas Iakovidis, 65, Greek folk singer
  - Jan Savage, 77, American garage rock guitarist (The Seeds)
- 6
  - Wayne Fontana, 74, British pop singer (The Mindbenders)
  - Vern Rumsey, 47, American post-hardcore and indie rock bassist (Unwound, Blonde Redhead, Household Gods)
- 7 – Mark Wirtz, 76, French pop singer
- 9
  - Salome Bey, 80, American-born Canadian soul singer
  - Martin Birch, 71, British music producer and recording engineer
- 10 – Don Martin, New Zealand new wave bassist (Mi-Sex)
- 11
  - Belle du Berry, 54, French chanson singer (Paris Combo)
  - Pat Fairley, 76, Scottish pop rock singer and bassist (Marmalade)
  - Trini Lopez, 83, American pop singer
- 13 – Steve Grossman, 69, American jazz fusion saxophonist
- 14
  - Julian Bream, 87, British classical guitarist
  - Ewa Demarczyk, 79, Polish cabaret singer and poet
  - Valentina Legkostupova, 54, Russian pop singer
  - Pete Way, 69, English rock bassist (UFO, Waysted, Fastway)
- 16 – Emman, 21, Filipino pop singer
- 17 – Jasraj, 90, Indian classical singer
- 18
  - Ron Heathman, American rock guitarist (Supersuckers)
  - Sean Pentecost, Australian alternative metal drummer (Superheist)
  - Hal Singer, 100, American jazz saxophonist and bandleader
- 19
  - Randall Craig Fleischer, 61, American classical conductor
  - Todd Nance, 57, American jam band drummer (Widespread Panic)
- 20
  - Frankie Banali, 68, American hard rock drummer (Quiet Riot, W.A.S.P.)
  - Justin Townes Earle, 38, American folk singer-songwriter
  - Mike Kirkland, 82, American folk musician (The Brothers Four)
  - Jack Sherman, 64, American funk rock guitarist (Red Hot Chili Peppers)
  - Piotr Szczepanik, 78, Polish pop singer
- 22
  - Walter Lure, 71, American punk rock guitarist (The Heartbreakers)
  - D. J. Rogers, 72, American soul singer
- 23
  - Peter King, 80, American jazz saxophonist and clarinetist
  - Charlie Persip, 91, American jazz drummer
- 24 – Riley Gale, 34, American thrash metal singer (Power Trip)
- 25
  - Georges Bœuf, 82, French opera composer and saxophonist
  - Mick Hart, Australian folk singer
  - Gerry McGhee, 58, British-Canadian hard rock singer (Brighton Rock)
- 27
  - Archana Mahanta, 71, Indian folk singer
  - Mike Noga, 43, Australian alternative rock drummer (The Drones, Legends of Motorsport)

=== September ===
- 1
  - John Meyer, 67, Australian rock slide guitarist (Rose Tattoo, Chain)
  - Ian Mitchell, 62, British pop rock bassist (Bay City Rollers)
  - Erick Morillo, 49, Colombian-American house and eurodance DJ (Reel 2 Real)
- 2 – Alexander Priko, 46, Russian pop rock keyboardist (Laskovyi Mai)
- 3 – Bill Pursell, 94, American easy listening composer
- 4
  - Gary Peacock, 85, American jazz double-bassist
  - Lucille Starr, 82, Canadian country singer
- 5 – Al G. Wright, 104, British-born American bandleader and conductor
- 6 – Bruce Williamson, 49, American R&B singer (The Temptations)
- 7 – Xavier Ortiz, 48, Mexican pop singer (Garibaldi)
- 8
  - Simeon Coxe, 82, American electronic rock singer and synthesizer player (Silver Apples)
  - Vexi Salmi, 77, Finnish pop rock lyricist
- 9
  - Ronald Bell, 68, American funk saxophonist (Kool & The Gang)
  - Sid McCray, 63, American punk rock singer (Bad Brains)
- 10 – Danny Webster, 61, American funk singer and guitarist (Slave)
- 11
  - Toots Hibbert, 77, Jamaican reggae singer-songwriter (Toots & The Maytals)
  - Reggie Johnson, 79, American jazz bassist
- 12 – Edna Wright, 76, American R&B singer (Honey Cone)
- 14
  - Al Kasha, 83, American pop songwriter
  - Peter Starkie, 72, Australian rock guitarist (Skyhooks, Jo Jo Zep & The Falcons)
- 16 – Roy C, 81, American soul singer
- 18
  - Georgia Dobbins, 78, American R&B singer (The Marvelettes) and songwriter
  - Pamela Hutchinson, 62, American R&B singer (The Emotions)
- 19
  - Lee Kerslake, 73, British hard rock drummer (Uriah Heep, Ozzy Osbourne, Toe Fat)
  - Dave Kusworth, 60, British indie rock singer (Jacobites)
- 21
  - Hamdi Benani, 77, Algerian pop singer and violinist
  - Tommy DeVito, 92, American pop singer and guitarist (The Four Seasons)
  - Roy Head, 79, American country singer-songwriter
  - Ira Sullivan, 89, American jazz trumpeter
- 23
  - Juliette Gréco, 93, French chanson singer
  - W. S. Holland, 85, American country drummer (The Tennessee Three, The Great Eighties Eight)
- 24 – Max Merritt, 79, New Zealand soul singer-songwriter and guitarist
- 25 – S. P. Balasubrahmanyam, 74, Indian playback singer
- 26
  - Masayoshi Kabe, 70, Japanese rock guitarist and bassist (The Golden Cups, Speed, Glue & Shinki, Vodka Collins)
  - Mark Stone, American hard rock bassist (Van Halen)
  - Jimmy Winston, 75, British rock keyboardist (Small Faces)
- 28 – Jackie Dennis, 77, Scottish pop singer
- 29
  - Mac Davis, 78, American country singer-songwriter
  - Rocco Prestia, 69, American funk bassist (Tower of Power)
  - Helen Reddy, 78, Australian-American pop singer

=== October ===
- 2 – Lisa Schouw, Australian pop singer (Girl Overboard)
- 3
  - Karel Fiala, 95, Czech opera singer
  - Anthony Galindo, 41, Venezuelan pop singer (Menudo, MDO)
- 6
  - Johnny Nash, 80, American pop and reggae singer-songwriter
  - Eddie Van Halen, 65, Dutch-born American hard rock guitarist and keyboardist (Van Halen)
- 7 – Ray Pennington, 86, American country singer-songwriter
- 8
  - Brian Locking, 81, British rock and roll bassist (The Shadows)
  - Mohammad-Reza Shajarian, 80, Iranian classical singer
- 9
  - David Refael ben Ami, 70, Israeli religious singer
  - Pierre Kezdy, 58, American punk rock bassist (Naked Raygun, Pegboy, Strike Under)
- 11
  - Harold Betters, 92, American jazz trombonist
  - Rajan, 87, Indian film composer (Rajan–Nagendra)
- 12
  - Jon Gibson, 80, American minimalist multi-instrumentalist (Philip Glass Ensemble)
  - Kim Massie, 62, American blues and soul singer
- 13 – Saint Dog, 44, American rapper (Kottonmouth Kings)
- 14 – Paul Matters, Australian hard rock bassist (AC/DC)
- 15 – Dave Munden, 76, British rock and roll drummer (The Tremeloes)
- 16
  - Johnny Bush, 85, American country singer-songwriter
  - Gordon Haskell, 74, British progressive rock and jazz singer and bassist (King Crimson, The Fleur de Lys)
  - P. S. Narayanaswamy, 86, Indian Carnatic singer
- 17 – Toshinori Kondo, 71, Japanese jazz trumpeter
- 18
  - Alfredo Cerruti, 78, Italian comedy rock musician and producer (Squallor)
  - Naâma, 84, Tunisian pop singer
  - José Padilla, 64, Spanish ambient DJ and producer
  - Maisa Tsuno, 29, Japanese indie rock guitarist (Akai Ko-en)
  - Chet "JR" White, 40, American indie rock bassist (Girls)
- 19
  - Spencer Davis, 81, Welsh rock guitarist (The Spencer Davis Group)
  - Tony Lewis, 62, British pop rock singer and guitarist (The Outfield)
- 21
  - Zero Babu, 80, Indian playback and Carnatic singer
  - Viola Smith, 107, American swing and classical drummer
- 22
  - Margie Bowes, 79, American country singer
  - K. Deep, 79, Burmese folk singer
- 23 – Jerry Jeff Walker, 78, American country singer-songwriter
- 25
  - Dolores Abril, 81, Spanish copla singer
  - Jan Boerman, 97, Dutch electronic composer
  - Rosanna Carteri, 89, Italian opera singer
  - Mahesh Kanodia, 83, Indian Gujarati film singer
- 26 – Stan Kesler, 92, American rock and roll guitarist and songwriter
- 28
  - Cano Estremera, 62, Puerto Rican salsa singer
  - Billy Joe Shaver, 81, American country singer-songwriter
- 29 – Denise Ferri, 76, American pop singer (The Delicates)
- 30 – Božidar Tanaskovic, Serbian alternative rock bassist (Bjesovi)
- 31
  - Rance Allen, 71, American gospel singer, guitarist and keyboardist (The Rance Allen Group)
  - Marc Fosset, 71, French jazz guitarist
  - MF Doom, 49, British-American rapper (KMD, Madvillain)

=== November ===
- 1
  - Pedro Iturralde, 91, Spanish jazz saxophonist
  - Phil K, 51, Australian electronic DJ (Lostep)
  - Nikki McKibbin, 42, American pop rock singer
  - Ronnie Peel, Australian rock guitarist (The La De Da's, Thunderclap Newman)
  - Esteban Santos, 69, Spanish pop singer (Bravo)
- 2 – T. N. Krishnan, 92, Indian Carnatic violinist
- 4 – Ken Hensley, 75, British rock singer, keyboardist and guitarist (Uriah Heep, Toe Fat, The Gods)
- 5
  - Len Barry, 78, American soul singer
  - Reynaert, 65, Belgian pop singer
  - Ossi Runne, 93, Belgian pop trumpeter and conductor
- 6
  - Stefano D'Orazio, 72, Italian pop drummer (Pooh)
  - King Von, 26, American rapper
  - Jim Radford, 92, British folk singer-songwriter
  - Timur Selçuk, 74, Turkish pop singer and pianist
- 7
  - Cándido Camero, 99, Cuban jazz percussionist
  - Bones Hillman, 62, New Zealand alternative rock bassist (Midnight Oil, The Swingers, Suburban Reptiles)
- 8 – Oscar Benton, 71, Dutch blues singer
- 10 – Alec Baillie, American punk rock bassist (Choking Victim, Leftöver Crack)
- 11
  - Adrian Cionco, 48, Argentine rock bassist (La Mosca Tsé - Tsé)
  - MO3, 28, American rapper
  - Andrew White, 78, American jazz saxophonist
- 12 – Jim Tucker, 74, American pop rock guitarist (The Turtles)
- 13
  - Kićo Slabinac, 76, Croatian folk singer
  - Doug Supernaw, 60, American country singer
- 14
  - Des O'Connor, 88, English comedian and pop singer
  - Don Heckman, 89, American jazz saxophonist, music critic, music journalist, and composer (d. 2020)
  - Eugenia Ratti, 87, Italian opera singer
- 16 – Bruce Swedien, 86, American recording engineer
- 18
  - László Benkő, 77, Hungarian progressive rock keyboardist (Omega)
  - Dominic Grant, 71, British pop singer (Guys 'n' Dolls)
  - Tony Hooper, 81, British folk rock guitarist (Strawbs)
- 21 – Tamás Mihály, 73, Hungarian progressive rock bassist (Omega)
- 23 – Hal Ketchum, 67, American country singer-songwriter
- 25
  - Duris Maxwell, 74, Canadian rock drummer
  - Flor Silvestre, 90, Mexican ranchera and huapango singer and actress
  - Camilla Wicks, 92, American classical violinist
- 26
  - Allan Botschinsky, 80, Danish jazz trumpeter
  - Cecilia Fusco, 87, Italian opera singer
  - Jamir Garcia, 42, Filipino nu metal singer (Slapshock)
- 28 – Piotr Strojnowski, 62, Polish reggae singer and guitarist (Daab)
- 29 – Miša Aleksić, 67, Serbian hard rock bassist (Riblja Čorba)
- 30 – Jack Wray, 81, American doo-wop singer (The Earls)

=== December ===
- 1 – Dan Morrison, Australian ska punk drummer (Area-7)
- 2
  - Volodymyr Huba, 81, Ukrainian film composer
  - Ron Mathewson, 76, British jazz bassist
- 3 – André Gagnon, 84, Canadian pianist, composer, and arranger
- 4 – Kenny Jeremiah, 78, American garage-rock singer (Soul Survivors)
- 6 – Džej Ramadanovski, 56, Serbian folk pop singer
- 7
  - LD Beghtol, 55, American experimental rock singer and multi-instrumentalist (LD & the New Criticism, Flare Acoustic Arts League, The Magnetic Fields)
  - Howard Wales, 77, American jazz and rock keyboardist
- 8 – Harold Budd, 84, American avant-garde composer and poet
- 9
  - Sean Malone, 50, American progressive rock bassist (Gordian Knot, Cynic)
  - Jason Slater, 49, American alternative rock bassist (Third Eye Blind, Snake River Conspiracy, Brougham)
- 10 – Kenneth Alwyn, 95, British classical composer and conductor
- 11 – Ubirany, 80, Brazilian samba hand-repique player (Fundo de Quintal)
- 12 – Charley Pride, 86, American country singer
- 13 – Andrey Sapunov, 64, Russian rock guitarist and bassist (Voskreseniye)
- 14 – Paulinho, 68, Brazilian soft rock singer (Roupa Nova)
- 15
  - Albert Griffiths, 74, Jamaican reggae singer and guitarist (The Gladiators)
  - Corlynn Hanney, 75, American pop-soul singer (The Groop)
  - Sam Jayne, 46, American indie rock singer and guitarist (Love as Laughter, Lync)
- 16 – Carl Mann, 78, American rockabilly singer
- 17
  - Jeff Clayton, 66, American jazz saxophonist
  - Stanley Cowell, 79, American jazz pianist (Heath Brothers)
- 19
  - Pelle Alsing, 60, Swedish pop rock drummer (Roxette)
  - Clay Anthony, 61, American hard rock bassist (Junkyard)
  - Pepe Salvaderi, Italian rock guitarist (Dik Dik)
- 20 – Chad Stuart, 79, British folk-pop singer and guitarist (Chad & Jeremy)
- 21 – K. T. Oslin, 78, American country singer-songwriter
- 23
  - John “Ecstasy” Fletcher, 56, American rapper (Whodini)
  - Leslie West, 75, American hard rock singer and guitarist (Mountain, West, Bruce and Laing, The Vagrants)
- 24
  - Ivry Gitlis, 98, Israeli classical violinist
  - Mojmir Sepe, 90, Slovenian classical composer and conductor
  - Geoff Stephens, 86, English songwriter and record producer, founder of The New Vaudeville Band
- 25 – Tony Rice, 69, American bluegrass guitarist (New South)
- 26 – Tito Rojas, 65, Puerto Rican salsa singer
- 27 – Richard Lewis Spencer, 78, American funk and soul singer and saxophonist (The Winstons)
- 28
  - Paul-Heinz Dittrich, 90, German composer
  - Armando Manzanero, 85, Mexican Mayan musician
- 29
  - Claude Bolling, 90, French jazz pianist and composer
  - Hugh X. Lewis, 90, American country music singer-songwriter
  - Phyllis McGuire, 89, American pop singer (The McGuire Sisters)
  - Rudy Salas, 72, American R&B and soul guitarist (El Chicano, Tierra)
- 30
  - Frank Kimbrough, 64, American jazz pianist
  - Alto Reed, 72, American rock saxophonist (Bob Seger & the Silver Bullet Band)
  - Eugene Wright, 97, American jazz bassist (Dave Brubeck Quartet)

== See also ==
- Timeline of musical events
- Women in music
- Impact of the COVID-19 pandemic on the music industry
