= 2020 in European music =

This article covers events in 2020 in continental European music, arranged in geographical order.

== Events ==
- 8 January
  - The Teatro San Cassiano in Venice, Italy, names the Academy of Ancient Music as its first associate ensemble.
  - The Zurich Festival {Festspiele Zürich} announces that its festival will be discontinued after 2020, because of the lack of long-term financial support.
  - Dutch composer Martijn Padding receives the Andreaspenning award at the Concertgebouw, in recognition of his services to the musical life of Amsterdam.
- 13 January – The Bavarian Radio Symphony Orchestra announces that it is to award its Karl Amadeus Hartmann Medal posthumously to Mariss Jansons.
- 26 February
  - José Manuel Rodríguez Uribes, the Spanish minister of culture, withdraws the invitation to operatic tenor Plácido Domingo to perform at the Teatro de la Zarzuela, following the release of an American Guild of Musical Artists report on allegations of sexual misconduct against Domingo.
  - The Landestheater Coburg announces the appointment of Daniel Carter as its new Generalmusikdirektor, with effect from 1 February 2021.
- 18 March – The Eurovision Song Contest 2020, scheduled to take place in Rotterdam is cancelled due to the COVID-19 pandemic in Europe – the first cancellation in the contest's 64-year history.

== Scandinavia ==
=== Top hits ===
- Danish number-one hits of 2020
- Finnish number-one singles of 2020, Finnish number-one albums of 2020
- Norwegian number-one songs in 2020
- Swedish number-one singles and albums in 2020

== Netherlands ==
- Dutch number-one singles of 2020

== Germany ==
- German number-one hits of 2020

== Switzerland and Austria ==
- Swiss number-one hits of 2020

== France ==
- French number-one hits of 2020

== Italy ==
- Italian number-one hits of 2020

== Eastern Europe/ Balkans ==
- List of Polish number-one singles of 2020
- Czech number-one songs of the 2020s
- Hungarian number-one singles of the 2020s

== Musical films ==
- If It Were Love (Si c'était de l'amour) (France)

== Deaths ==
- 1 January – Damir Mihanović, 58, Croatian comedian, actor and musician (lung cancer)
- 3 January – Bo Winberg, 80, Swedish guitarist (The Spotnicks)
- 10 January – Marc Morgan, 57, Belgian singer-songwriter
- 14 January – Guy Deplus, 95, French clarinetist
- 19 January – Guy Thomas, 85, Belgian-born French songwriter.
- 21 January
  - Herbert Baumann, 94, German composer and conductor
  - Meritxell Negre, 48, Spanish singer (cancer)
- 4 February – Volker David Kirchner, 77, German violist and composer
- 26 February
  - Eduardo Bort, 72, Spanish guitarist
  - Hans Deinzer, 86, German clarinetist
  - Sergei Dorensky, 88, Russian pianist
- 1 March – Peter Wieland, 89, German singer and entertainer
- 8 March – Martin Davorin-Jagodić, 84, Croatian composer
- 9 March – Alain Marcel, 68, Algerian-born French actor, composer and musical theatre producer
- 10 March – Beba Selimović, 80, Bosnian sevdalinka singer
- 14 March – Eva Pilarová, 80, Czech singer
- 16 March
  - Sergio Bassi, 69, Italian folk singer-songwriter (COVID-19)
  - Konstantin Ryabinov, 55, Russian musician and visual artist
- 18 March – Jean Leber, 80–81, French violinist (COVID-19)
- 20 March
  - Enrique del Portal, 87, Spanish operatic tenor
  - Gino Volpe, 77, Italian singer-songwriter, heart attack.
- 21 March – Hellmut Stern, 91, German violinist
- 24 March – Gerard Schurmann, 96, Dutch-British composer and conductor (The Bedford Incident, Attack on the Iron Coast, Claretta).
- 31 March – Zoltán Peskó, 83, Hungarian conductor and composer.
- 1 April – Dieter Reith, 82, German pianist and organist
- 4 April – Patrick Gibson, 64, French drummer and singer (Gibson Brothers), COVID-19.
- 7 April – André Stordeur, 79, Belgian electronic musician.
- 9 April – Bert van de Kamp, 73, Dutch music journalist
- 14 April – Kerstin Meyer, 92, Swedish mezzo-soprano.
- 16 April
  - Christophe, 74, French singer-songwriter (COPD)
  - Dušan Vančura, 82, Czech singer, double-bassist and lyricist (Spirituál kvintet)
- 9 June – Pau Donés, 43, Spanish singer songwriter and guitarist
- 5 October – Béatrice Arnac, 89, French actress and singer
- 7 October – Jean Martin, 92, French pianist
- 11 October – Boro Drljača, 79, Serbian folk singer
- 18 October – Alfredo Cerruti, 78, Italian television author, music producer, and singer
- 19 October
  - Vaclovas Daunoras, 83, Lithuanian opera singer
  - Gianni Dei, 79, Italian actor and singer
- 25 October
  - Dolores Abril, 85, Spanish singer and actress
  - Jan Boerman, 97, Dutch electronic music composer
  - György Fischer, 85, Hungarian pianist and conductor
- 1 November
  - Esteban Santos, 69, Spanish pop singer
  - Eva Zikmundová, 88, Czech opera singer
- 5 November – Reynaert, 65, Belgian singer (COVID-19)
- 7 November – Brian Coll, 79, Irish musician
- 13 November – Kićo Slabinac76, Croatian pop singer
