= Emigrate (disambiguation) =

Emigrate is the verb for the word emigration.

Emigrate may refer to:

- Emigrate (band), American industrial metal band
- Emigrate (album), 2007 studio album by Emigrate
- eMigrate (portal), India government digital portal

== See also ==
- Emigrante (disambiguation)
- Immigrant (disambiguation)
- Migrant (disambiguation)
- The Emigrants (disambiguation)
