= Immigrant (disambiguation) =

An immigrant is a person who moves to another country.

(The) Immigrant(s) may also refer to:

== Art ==
- The Immigrants (sculpture), a 1971 sculpture in Los Angeles by Alberto Biasi
- The Immigrants (sculpture in Adelaide), a 2006 sculpture by Aurelio Fortelaan in Adelaide, Australia

== Film and television ==
- The Immigrant (1915 film), a feature film produced by Jesse Lasky
- The Immigrant (1917 film), a comedy short written and directed by Charles Chaplin
- Immigrants (1948 film), an Italian drama film
- The Immigrant (1990 film), an Iranian film directed by Ebrahim Hatamikia
- Immigrants (2008 film), a Hungarian film
- The Immigrant (2013 film), an American drama film written and directed by James Gray
- Immigrant (TV series), an upcoming American drama streaming television miniseries

== Music ==
- The Immigrant: A New American Musical, a musical based on a play by Mark Harelik
- "Immigrant Song", a 1970 song by Led Zeppelin
- "The Immigrant" (Neil Sedaka song), a 1975 song by Neil Sedaka
- "Immigrants (We Get the Job Done)", a 2016 song by K'naan, Snow Tha Product, Riz MC, and Residente, based on the musical Hamilton
- Immigrant (album), a 2018 album by Belly

== Other uses ==
- Abd al-Rahman I, emir of Cordoba, known by the sobriquet of "The Immigrant"
- HaOlim (The Immigrants), a defunct political party in Israel
- The Immigrants, a 1977 novel by Howard Fast

== See also ==
- Migrant (disambiguation)
- The Emigrants (disambiguation)
- Immigration
