= The Emigrants =

An emigrant is a person who has participated in emigration

The Emigrants or Emigrant may refer to:

- The Emigrants (novel series), four novels by Swedish author Vilhelm Moberg:
  - The Emigrants (Moberg novel) (1949), (Swedish title: Utvandrarna)
    - Unto a Good Land (1952), (Swedish title: Invandrarna)
    - The Settlers (novel) (1956), (Swedish title: Nybyggarna)
    - The Last Letter Home (1959), (Swedish title: Sista brevet till Sverige)
  - The Emigrants (1971 film), a film adaption by Jan Troell of Moberg's first two novels
    - The New Land, a sequel to the 1971 film
  - The Emigrants (2021 film), a film adaption by Erik Poppe
- The Emigrants (Sebald novel), a 1993 novel by German author W.G. Sebald
- The Emigrants, a novel by Norwegian author Johan Bojer Vor egen stamme or The Emigrants (1924/English 1925)
- The Emigrants, a poem by Charlotte Smith published in two volumes in 1793.
- The Emigrants (Lamming novel), a 1954 novel by Barbadian author George Lamming
- The Emigrants; or, The History of an Expatriated Family, a 1793 novel by American author Gilbert Imlay
- The Emigrants (miniseries), a 1977 Australian miniseries
- The Emigrant (1994 film), an Egyptian film by Youssef Chahine
- The Emigrant (1940 film), a French comedy film
- El emigrante (film), a.k.a. "The Emigrant" (film), a 1960 Spanish comedy film
- Emigranti, (sr) a.k.a. "Emigrants", a 2002 Yugoslavian film
- "Emigrant", the nom de plure of Yosif Gotman

== Places ==
- Emigrant, Montana
- Emigrant Peak
- Emigrant Lake (Oregon)
- Emigrant Pass (disambiguation), several mountain passes
- Emigrant Wilderness, a forest
- Emigrant Springs, Lincoln County, Wyoming
- Emigrant Springs Formation, Nevada
- Emigrant Springs State Heritage Area
- Emigrant Trails, see Westward Expansion Trails

== Other ==
- Catopsilia, butterflies known as "Emigrants"
- Emigrant Savings Bank, a bank
- Emigrant Church, Sletta, Norway

== See also ==
- Emigrante (disambiguation)
- Immigrant (disambiguation)
- Migrant (disambiguation)
- Emigration
