= Emigrante =

Emigrante may refer to:

- Emigrantes Immigrants (1948 film)
- El emigrante (film), a 1960 Spanish film
- El emigrante (micro story), a very short story by Mexican author Luis Felipe Lomelí
- Emigrante (Orishas album)
- Emigrante (Tanghetto album)
- El emigrante (song), a 1949 song by Juanito Valderrama

== See also ==
- The Emigrants (disambiguation)
