= Adrian Ivanițchi =

Romanian folk musician

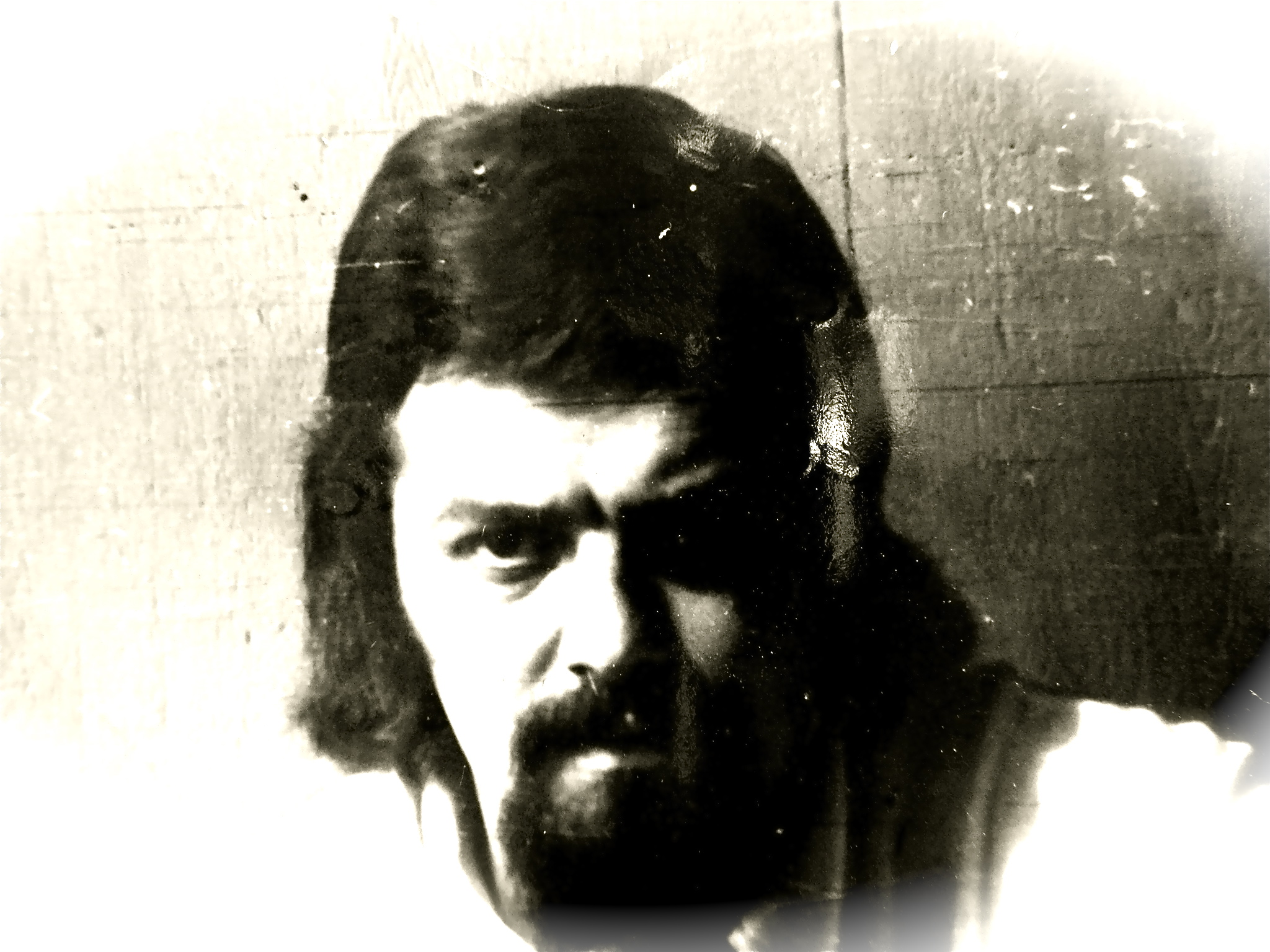

Background information
- Born: Adrian Ivanițchi; September 15, 1947; Sighișoara, Kingdom of Romania
- Genres: Rock, folk
- Occupation: Singer
- Instrument: Guitar
- Years active: 1965-present
- Website: adrianivanitchi.ro

Adrian Ivanițchi (born September 15, 1947) is a Romanian folk musician and guitarist.

== Career ==
He was one of the founding members of Coral, one of the first Romanian beat music groups. He played with several popular Romanian pop/rock groups in the 1960s, including Sideral and Sfinx.

In his hometown, Sighișoara, he started 2 bands, called Melody and Tarabostes in the late 1960- early 1970s. In 1982 he started a band called Bastion.

He was a founding member of the Agora poetry and music circle in Sighişoara in the 1970s. Chief organizer of the Sighișoara Folk Festival held in 1974.

Director of the Inter-ethnic Youth Center in Sighișoara, and one of the organizers of the ProEtnica festivals held annually in Sighișoara.

In 2002 he issued a CD called Amintirea paradisului.
