= Sorin Chifiriuc =

Sorin Chifiriuc (born 1950, Bucharest, Romania) is a rock, new wave, and blues guitarist and vocalist.

Affectionately called Skifi by his fans, and a student of the Bucharest Music Conservatory (where he studied the violin, but which he did not graduate from), he is also known for his unconventional behaviour on stage.

He was a member of many well-known Romanian rock bands, such as Curtea Veche nr. 43, Sfinx, Iris, Domino, Roata, Electric Red Roosters, 2 Galbini.

After the Romanian Revolution of 1989, he worked for a while as a DJ for Radio Nova 22.

He spent his time between about 2004 and 2013 in a monastery in the Militari neighborhood of Bucharest, where he was known as Ierafim.
