= Curtea Veche nr. 43 =

Romanian band

- Origin: Bucharest, Romania
- Genres: rock, Rhythm and blues, progressive rock, experimental rock
- Years active: 1974–1977
- Labels: Electrecord
- Past members: Sorin Chifiriuc; Florin Ochescu; Traian Sasu; Florin Iordănescu; Bogdan Stănescu; Mircea Florian; Gabriel Căciulă; Radu Mihai Răducanu

Curtea Veche nr. 43 were a Romanian musical band who were active in the mid-1970s.

They formed in 1974 as a trio: Sorin Chifiriuc (guitar), Traian Sasu (drums) and Nicușor Curta (bass). Except for Florin Ochescu, who was a student at the Bucharest Polytechnics Institute, the other three members were students at the Bucharest Music Academy. Later, Curta was replaced by Florin Iordănescu, and Florin Ochescu joined as a guitarist. During the years several member changes took place, the band collaborating also with Mircea Florian, who contributed both music and lyrics.

The band recorded some songs at the state-owned radio studio, and appeared sporadically also on television, for example on Club A.

== Records ==
- Imn-Proiect on the collective Electrecord record "Formații românești pop”, vol. II. (1976)

== See also ==
- Sorin Chifiriuc
