= Yigal Yasinov =

Israeli politician

Faction represented in the Knesset
- 2003–2006: Shinui
- 2006: HaOlim
- 2006: National Union
- 2006: Yisrael Beiteinu

Other roles
- 2005: Shadow Minister of Welfare & Social Services

Personal details
- Born: 27 April 1966 (age 60) Kharkiv, Soviet Union

Yigal Yasinov (Hebrew: יגאל יאסינוב, born 27 April 1966) is an Israeli former politician who served as a member of the Knesset for Shinui, HaOlim the National Union and Yisrael Beiteinu between 2003 and 2006.

== Biography ==
Born in Kharkiv in the Soviet Union (today in Ukraine), Yasinov immigrated to Israel in 1993.

Yasinov joined Shinui prior to the 1999 elections, and worked as a parliamentary assistant to Victor Brailovsky. Active in the party's Jerusalem branch, he was placed 15th on the Shinui list for the 2003 elections, and entered the Knesset when the party won 15 seats. During his first term, he was a member of the Science and Technology Committee, the Committee on the Rights of the Child, the Public Petitions Committee, the Committee for Immigration, Absorption and Diaspora Affairs, and the Labour, Welfare and Health Committee. In January 2004 he was the victim of an attempted stabbing outside his home in the Jerusalem neighbourhood of Ramat Sharett. In November 2005 he was injured in a brawl with students during a protest in Rabin Square in Tel Aviv.

On 1 February 2006 he left Shinui to form the HaOlim faction, which then merged into the Yisrael Beiteinu faction of the National Union. Towards the end of the Knesset term, Yisrael Beiteinu broke away from the National Union. He was placed 14th on the party's list for the 2006 elections, and lost his seat when they won 11 seats.

After leaving politics he became Deputy Chairman of the Jewish National Fund.
