= Juanito Valderrama =

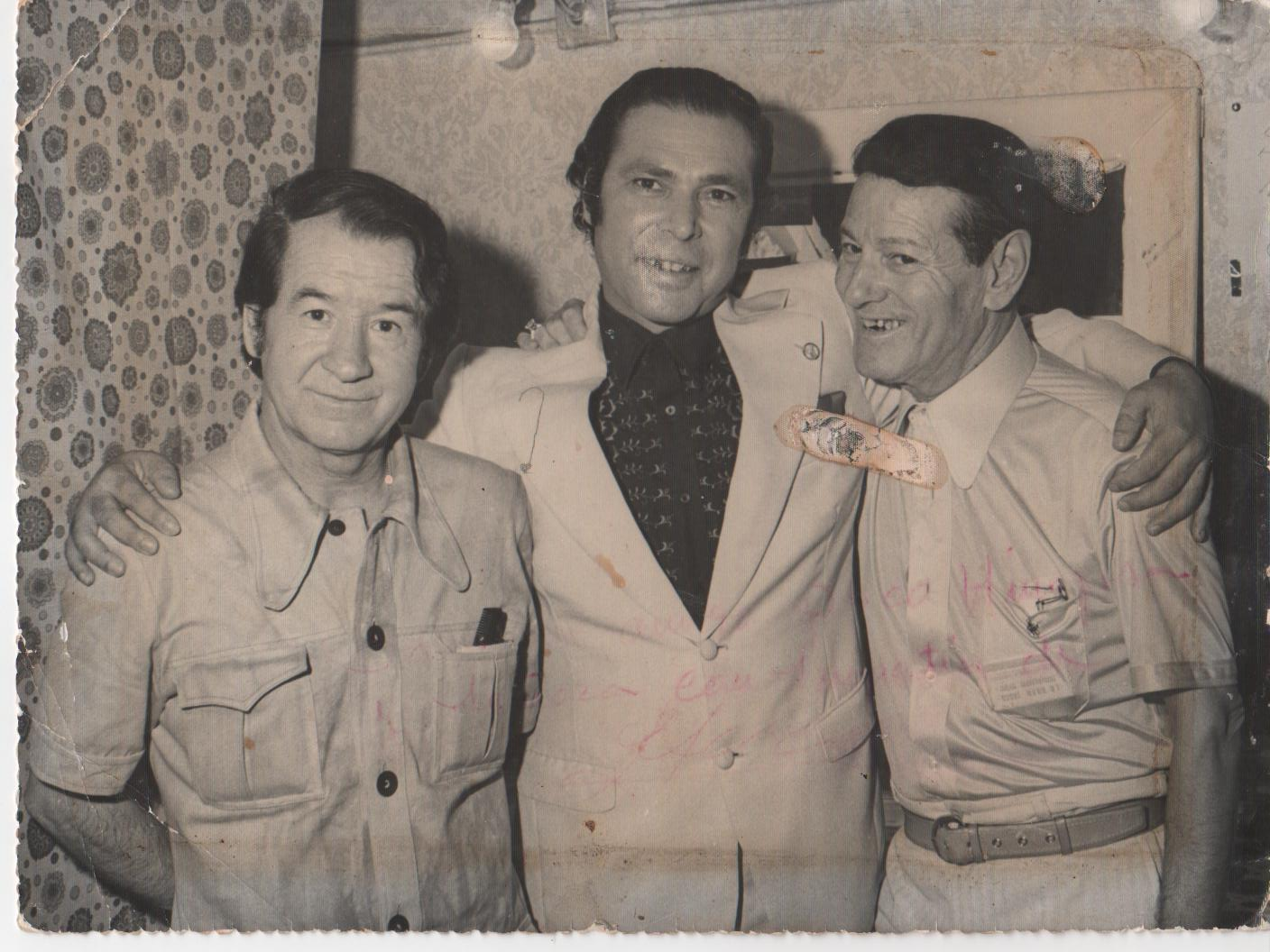
- Valderrama, Juan el de la Vara and Pepe Marchena
- Born: Juan Valderrama Blanca; 24 May 1916; Torredelcampo (Jaén), Spain
- Died: 12 April 2004 (aged 87); Espartinas (Seville), Spain
- Occupation: Singer
- Years active: 1935–2004
- Spouse: Dolores Abril (1954–2004)
- Children: Juan Antonio Valderrama; Juana Dolores Valderrama Caballero

Juan Valderrama Blanca (24 May 1916 – 12 April 2004), better known as Juanito Valderrama, was a Spanish flamenco and folk singer. Although he was known for singing copla, he always claimed to be a flamenco singer.

Born in Torredelcampo, Juanito's recording career began in 1935 and lasted more than 60 years. Among his most famous songs is "El emigrante", written in 1949, a ballad for the millions of displaced Spaniards who fled the country in the years after the Spanish Civil War. In 1960 he appeared in the film of the same name.

He was romantically and professionally partnered with singer and actress Dolores Abril from 1954 until his death in 2004. The couple had two children, Juan Antonio Valderrama and Juana Dolores Valderrama, who both became singers.

== Filmography ==
| Year | Title | Role | Notes |
|---|---|---|---|
| 1956 | El rey de la carretera | Rafael | |
| 1960 | El emigrante | Quino | |
| 1966 | Gitana | Manuel | |
| 1966 | De barro y oro | Juan | |
| 1967 | La niña del patio | Juanito Valderrama | |
| 1968 | El padre Coplillas | Don Fernando, el 'Padre Coplillas' | (final film role) |
