= El emigrante (song) =

El emigrante is a Spanish flamenco song, written by Juanito Valderrama in 1949. It is a ballad for the millions of displaced Spaniards who fled the country in the years after the Spanish Civil War, credited with raising national consciousness. It has been performed by George Dalaras and Paco de Lucia.
