= Enrique del Portal =

Spanish actor (1932–2020)

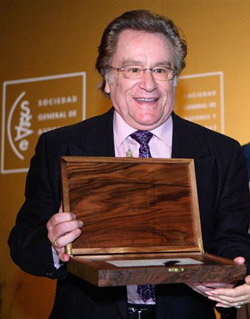
Enrique del Portal

Enrique Ruiz del Portal González (3 July 1932 in Madrid – 20 March 2020) was a Spanish tenor and actor. His career began in 1959 in Teatro de la Zarzuela. He retired in 2014. On 5 March 2020, Portal suffered a fall at his home in Madrid. He was unable to be hospitalized due to the COVID-19 pandemic. His health deteriorated and he died on 20 March from gastroenteritis, aged 87.
