= Gino Volpe =

Italian singer-songwriter (1943–2020)

- Born: c. 1943; Marsico Nuovo, Italy
- Died: March 20, 2020 (aged 76–77)
- Occupation: Singer-songwriter

Gino Volpe (c. 1943 – March 20, 2020) was an Italian singer-songwriter.
