= Jan & Kjeld =

Danish musical duo

Jan & Kjeld were a musical duo from Denmark, consisting of brothers Jan Wennick (born in Copenhagen, Denmark; 27 July 1946) and Kjeld Wennick (born in Gränna, Sweden; 3 February 1944 – 31 May 2020). Both brother were singers and banjo players. The duo, active in the late 1950s and early 1960s, was especially successful in Germany with a number of schlager-style songs. They are perhaps best known for their 1960 song "Banjo Boy", which was their only tune that had achieved national hit parade prosperity in the United States by means of the Cash Box top 100 singles thru which this tune had peaked at position #62 and the Billboard Hot 100 thru which this song had peaked at position #58.

The brother began performing as a duo, Jan and Kjeld, in 1956. The duo's first recording, "Tiger Rag", became a hit in Denmark and in Germany. Later that year, their worldwide breakthrough came with the song "Banjo Boy", which reached no 1 on the German hit parade and gave the young duo a gold record and a bronze lion on the Radio Luxembourg.

In 1983, Kjeld founded a record company, Mega Records and signed the Swedish pop group Ace of Base. In 2001, he sold the record company and music publisher to Edel Records. He was subsequently a judge at a number of talent shows on Danish television. Kjeld Wennick died of cancer at age 76. He had been diagnosed with kidney cancer three years earlier, and by the time of his death it had spread to the bones.
