= Jean Martin (pianist) =

French pianist (1927–2020)

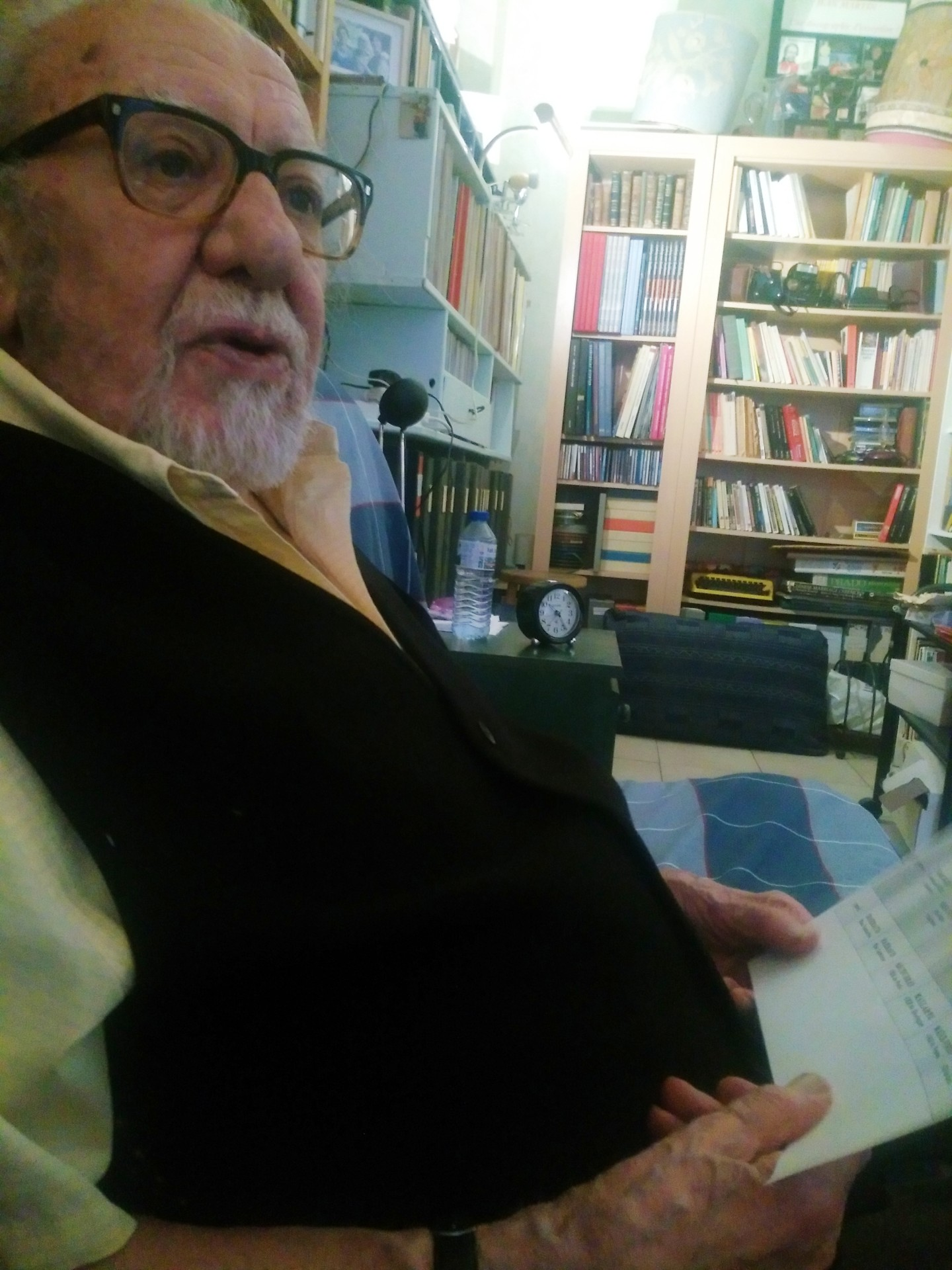
- Martin in 2019
- Born: 7 November 1927; Lyon, France
- Died: 7 October 2020 (aged 92); Paris, France
- Occupation: Pianist

Jean Martin (7 November 1927 – 7 October 2020) was a French pianist.

== Biography ==
Martin started studying music in his hometown of Lyon before going to the Conservatoire de Paris, where he was a student of Yves Nat. Graduating in 1946, he also perfected his skills under the direction of Guido Agosti.

Martin began a teaching career, starting in Grenoble in 1953, before moving to Saint-Quentin, Bobigny, and Versailles. He also served as director of music at the Théâtre Essaïon and the Théâtre Paris-Villette. He also gave master classes in interpretation in Porto.

Martin was a specialist in the romantic repertoire. He recorded two albums dedicated to the works of Carl Maria von Weber, five dedicated to Robert Schumann, two to Stephen Heller and Gabriel Fauré, as well as works by Clara Schumann, Johannes Brahms, Benjamin Godard, and Theodor Kirchner.

Claude Ballif dedicated some works to Martin, including the 5th Sonata.

In 1970, he played with the Trio Delta with violinist Flora Elphège and cellist Claude Burgos. Critics noticed Martin's playing with "temperament, the richness of the sounds and the wisdom of the interpretation".

Martin died on 7 October 2020 in Paris, aged 92.

== Writings ==
- Jouez avec doigté… : deux mains… dix doigts… mais tellement plus : traité sur les doigtés (2001)
