= Migrant =

Migrant is a term that may refer to:

== Human migration ==
- Human migration, including:
  - Emigration, leaving one's resident country with the intent to settle elsewhere. 1988 Webster's Definition. One who migrates, esp. from 1 region to another in search of seasonal work.,
  - Immigration, movement into a country with the intent to settle
  - Economic migrant, someone who emigrates from one region to another to seek an improvement in living standards
  - Internal migration, within one geopolitical entity, usually a nation-state
  - Migrant worker, one who migrates, possibly to another country, for work
  - Expatriate

== Other uses ==
- Bird migration, regular seasonal movement of birds between breeding and wintering grounds
- Migrant (album), by American rock band The Dear Hunter
- "Migrants" (Stewart Lee's Comedy Vehicle), a TV episode

== See also ==
- Migrant literature
- Migration (disambiguation)
- Immigrant (disambiguation)
- The Emigrants (disambiguation)
