= Emigrant Pass =

Emigrant Pass may refer to:

- Emigrant Pass (Nevada), a mountain pass carrying Interstate 80 over the Emigrant Hills of northern Eureka County, Nevada
- Emigrant Pass (Oregon), in the Cascade Mountains
- Emigrant Pass (Lassen Volcanic National Park), a California crossing of the Nobles Emigrant Trail
- Emigrant Pass (Tahoe National Forest), a California Sierra Crest crossing used for the Western States Endurance Run (39°11′25″N 120°16′37″W)
- Emigrant Pass (Emigrant Wilderness), West Walker River route over the California Sierra Crest (38°12′01″N 119°37′54″W)
- Emigrant Pass (Death Valley), a site on the path of the Death Valley '49ers
- Emigrant Pass (Nopah Range), a mountain pass in Inyo County, California
- A mountain pass that carries Interstate 70 in Utah over the Wasatch Range
- Emigrant Gap, a California Trail crossing on the west Sierra slope near the Emigrant Gap, California community named for the crossing

== See also ==
- Emigrant, for passes (documents and permissions)
