= The Groop (US band) =

American psychedelic pop and soul quartet

- Origin: Los Angeles, California, U.S.
- Genres: Northern Soul, Psychedelic pop
- Years active: 1968–1970
- Label: Bell Records/Sundazed USA
- Past members: Corlynn Hanney; Susan Musmanno; Richard Caruso; Jeffrey Comanor

The Groop were a harmony-based psychedelic pop and soul vocal quartet from the USA, active at the end of the 1960s and releasing one self-titled album. Their song "A Famous Myth" was included on the contemporary Midnight Cowboy film soundtrack.

Corlynn Hanney (born on March 3, 1945) died on December 15, 2020. She had suffered from Lewy body dementia, and died of COVID-19, at age 75.

== Discography ==
- The Groop (1969)
