= André Stordeur =

Belgian electronic music composer (1941–2020)

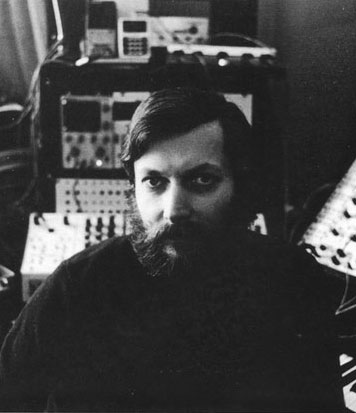

Background information
- Born: André Stordeur; 1 March 1941; Haine St Paul, Belgium
- Died: 7 April 2020 (aged 79)
- Genres: electronic, electroacoustic, acousmatic
- Occupations: Composer, Educator

André Stordeur (1 March 1941 – 7 April 2020) was a Belgian electronic music composer.

== Life ==
Stordeur was born in Haine-Saint-Paul. His musical career started in 1977 with a tape composition for the soundtrack to a film on Gordon Matta-Clark titled Office Baroque, by Eric Convents and Roger Steylaerts. Later in the 1970s, he participated in the avantgarde music ensemble Studio voor Experimentele Muziek, founded in Antwerp, Flanders, by Joris De Laet in 1973. S.E.M.'s associate composers in the 1970s included: Dirk Veulemans, Paul Adriaenssens, Karel Goeyvaerts, Lucien Goethals and Serge Verstockt. Stordeur founded his own electronic music studio Studio Synthèse in 1973 in Brussels.

From 1978, he often collaborated with his companion Fabrice du Busquiel. They performed together, notably in 2014, on the occasion of the play A Late Night with Laika, which Mauro Pawlovski edited at the AB in Brussels.(Gonzo circus archief)

In 1979, he collaborated with Paul-Baudouin Michel on an electroacoustic music composition titled Phraséologie, recorded at the Institut voor Psychoacustica en Elektronische Muziek studio, a.k.a. IPEM, the Ghent University electronic music studio since 1962. Also in 1979, he published a solo recording of his electronic music titled 18 Days, with compositions using an EMS AKS and a modified 8 voice patchable Oberheim SEM system.

Since 1980, Stordeur composed exclusively on a Serge synthesizer, either a Serge series 79 or a Serge prototype 1980, which was especially built for him by Serge Tcherepnin himself. Since 1983, Stordeur was the Serge company's official consultant for Europe.

In 1981, Stordeur composed the music for Belgian film director Christian Mesnil's documentary Du Zaïre au Congo. He studied at IRCAM in 1981 with [David Wessel***] and then flew to the US to study with Morton Subotnick, who was also a familiar figure at IRCAM between 1979 and 1981.

Stordeur became an influential sound synthesis teacher and, in 1997, completed his Art of Analog Modular Synthesis by Voltage Control, a guide to everything modular (Serge, EMS, etc.). Stordeur maintained the Analog Cottage website, where he offered some of his advice and articles.

In 2004, he contributed one track to a Serge synthesizer revival CD titled Serge Modular Music: Now, published by Egres, California. In 2009, Stordeur appeared on a version of Giacinto Scelsi's Tre Canti Popolari, published by the Sub Rosa (label), where he played electronic distortion of live instruments.
