= Georges Bœuf =

French composer (1937–2020)

- Born: 21 December 1937; Marseille, France
- Died: 25 August 2020 (aged 82); Marseille, France
- Occupations: Composer; Musician
- Website: georges.boeuf.free.fr

Georges Bœuf (21 December 1937 – 25 August 2020) was a French composer, musician, and saxophonist. He composed operas and film scores, among others.

== Life ==
Born in Marseille, Bœuf studied at the Conservatoire de Marseille (CRRM). In 1969, he co-founded the Groupe de musique expérimentale de Marseille (GMEM), of which he became president in 1974. In 1988, he founded the composition class at the CRRM, which was first directed by Pierre Barbizet.

Bœuf taught musical training, sound technique, and organology. He composed hundreds of musical works, including for theatrical and cinematic productions. He also composed three film scores for director René Allio's films Transit, Le Matelot 512, and Retour à Marseille. He composed La Chant de la Nature for the permanent exhibition in the National Museum of Natural History in Paris.

Bœuf composed an opera titled Verlaine Paul, based on the work of poet Franck Venaille. It was shown at the Opéra national de Lorraine in Nancy on 29 October 1996, with the baritone François Le Roux in a lead role. It was given a reprise in 2003 at La Criée in Marseille with a new staging by Frédéric Bélier-Garcia.

Among his late works were a string quartet, performed by the Parisii Quartet; Orbes for 12 strings, premiered by the Orchestre royal de Wallonie; Septimo (1998) for vibraphone and bells, recorded by Frédéric Daumas (Fragrance, 1999); Le Prophète, on a Stéphane Mallarmé text for baritone and piano (1998), premiered by François Le Roux and Alexandre Tharaud at the François Mitterrand Library; Solitaire Vigie, also on Mallarmé, for large orchestra and choir, premiered in Nancy in January 2000; Variasix for instrumental ensemble, performed by the Télémaque ensemble (Aix-en-Provence, 2001); Koré ou L'Oubli for keyboard-percussion quartet in 2002, performed by the Symblêma ensemble; Sonata for violin, performed by Nicolas Miribel; Six Monodies de l'absence for tenor saxophone, performed by Joël Versavaud; Dans le bruit du monde for choir, performed by the contemporary Roland Hayrabedian Choir; and Messe des cendres.

Georges Bœuf died in Marseille on 25 August 2020 at the age of 82.
