= El emigrante (film) =

- Film poster
- Directed by: Sebastián Almeida
- Written by: Antonio Quintero
- Produced by: Fidel Osete
- Cinematography: Ricardo Albiñana
- Edited by: Ramón Quadreny
- Production company: Vértice P.C.
- Release date: 1960
- Running time: 73 minutes
- Country: Spain
- Language: Spanish

El emigrante (meaning The Emigrant) is a 1960 Spanish comedy film directed by Sebastián Almeida, and starring Juanito Valderrama, Julio Núñez and Silvia Solar. The film is set in the Carnival of Cádiz. It was shot in Cádiz. The film was released on 12 December 1960.

== Cast ==
- Juanito Valderrama
- Julio Núñez
- Silvia Solar
- Dolores Abril
- Francisco Piquer
- Rogelio Madrid
- José Marco
- Emilio Fábregas
- José María Caffarel
- Marta Flores
- Julio Gallego
- Ángela Liaño
- Jesús Puche
