= EMigrate (portal) =

Indian government portal

eMigrate
- Formation: 2014; 12 years ago
- Type: Governmental project
- Headquarters: Sushma Swaraj Bhawan, New Delhi
- Region served: India
- Official language: English, Hindi, Tamil, Bangla, Gujarati, and other Indian languages
- Protector General of Emigrants (PGE): Shri Surinder Bhagat
- Parent organisation: Ministry of External Affairs
- Website: emigrate.gov.in

eMigrate is an Indian digital portal developed by Ministry of External Affairs, Government of India in 2014. It automates emigration processes and facilitates a safety and legal support to Indian workers employed abroad, particularly blue-collar laborers.

== Background ==
eMigrate was launched in 2014 by the Overseas Employment Division of MEA, India.

In October 2024, External Affairs Minister, S. Jaishankar relaunched the portal as version 2.0 with more functionalities including a 24*7 multilingual helpline support to address workers' issues and quicker registration of feedbacks for redressal. Other digital solutions like DigiLocker were also integrated to the portal enabling emigrants to submit various documents paperless and obtain clearances faster.

== Platform ==
The Protector General of Emigrants (PGE) issues registration certifications to recruiting agencies who can employ Indian workers overseas. The eMigrate platform lists more than 1800 registered private agencies for transparency to safeguard workers from fraudulent hiring, as per Emigration Act 1983. The platform also lists State Manpower Export Corporations that are registered by PGE, namely in the states of Andhra Pradesh, Delhi, Haryana, Himachal Pradesh, Kerala, Punjab, Karnataka, Tamil Nadu, and Uttar Pradesh.
