= Sfinx (band) =

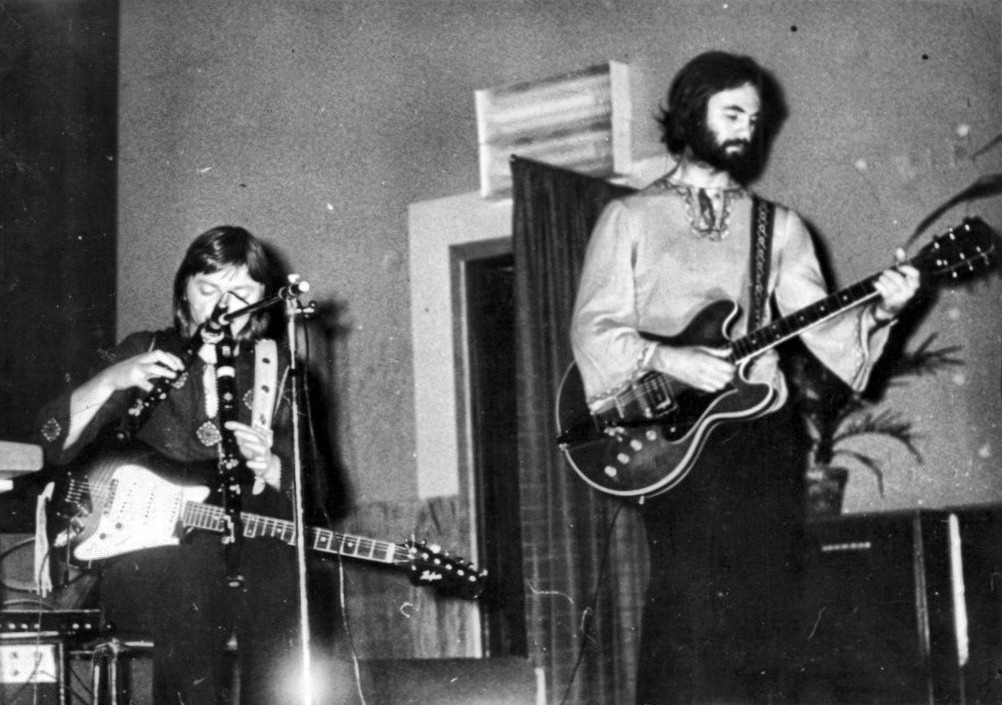

Background information
- Origin: Bucharest, Romania
- Genre: Beat (early) Progressive rock (70s) New wave (later)
- Years active: 1962–1994
- Label: Electrecord
- Spinoffs: Sfinx Experience

Sfinx was a Romanian rock group in the 1970s. Phoenix was a rival Romanian band.

== History ==
=== The early years (1963–1973) ===
The band was formed in 1963, in Bucharest. It was singer and guitarist Octav Zemlicka who had the idea to start the band. ("Sfinx" is Romanian for sphinx) The initial line up included bassist Corneliu Ionescu, nicknamed "Bibi", who would be the only member to stay with the band until they disbanded. In 1966, Sfinx were aired for the first time on radio, with Îmi place muzica ("I love music") and their eponymous song, Sfinx. 1968 brought drummer Marian Toroimac into the band, and together with him, the young and shy Dan Andrei Aldea (both had been members of a band called Memphis). The latter left the band in 1969 for several months and returned, and he would assume control of the band and make it one of the finest rock acts in Romania.

The band played as a trio (Aldea, Ionescu, Toroimac) for several years. They used to play covers of songs by The Beatles, Jimi Hendrix, Ten Years After, The Doors, The Kinks etc. As of 1972, they recorded their first single disc, Şir de cocori/Languir me fais (First title translated: "Flock of Cranes". The latter was an arrangement of a lied by George Enescu).

=== Classic Sfinx (1973–1980) ===
1973 found Sfinx without a drummer, after Toroimac left. Aldea and "Bibi" Ionescu, together with flautist Doru Donciu, set out on a number of musical experiments, of which very few were recorded. Towards the end of 1973, two drummers were proposed to join the band, of which the former was replaced by the skillful Mihai (Mişu) Cernea (the ex-drummer of pop band Mondial, who was also a gifted composer, with whom some of the best records of Romanian rock were taped around 1970). Hornist Petre Iordache, a former member of the band, briefly joined when the band's first EP was recorded in 1974, Coborîse primăvara/Ziua ta/Fiii soarelui/Peste vîrfuri ("Spring descended/Birthday/Sons of sun/Over crests").

In 1974 guitarist and composer Dan Bădulescu joins Sfinx, and from that point on (until the 1980s), the band had only a few changes of personnel. Their first LP, Lume albă ("White world") was released in 1975 and enjoyed a great success with the audience and critics. At this point, the rival band Phoenix had released their own successful LP, Cantofabule, which however was not their first. Now that Sfinx had their own LP, the tension between the two bands' fans grew higher, so the Sfinx LP cover art humorously features some of the very passionate articles found in newspapers of the time.

When Bădulescu joined, the band started collaborating with the Romanian Agency for Artistic Promotion, so the first coordinates were established, regarding future concert tours throughout the country and abroad. For instance, the band would be allowed to concert periodically in Belgium for a number of years.

Only a few months after Lume albă, another project was mostly finalized: the ambitious concept album Zalmoxe, featuring lyrics by Romanian poet Alexandru Basarab. Bădulescu had left the band and Aldea invited instead a highschool friend, talented keyboard player Nicolae (Nicu) Enache. The album's release was however delayed for three years for political censorship reasons, so it came out only in 1978 on a single LP instead of a double album, as the band initially had planned. Meanwhile, Jon Anderson's backing band released Olias of Sunhillow in 1976 and when Aldea listened to it, he thought of trying to make a "timid" response out of their own album. After the release of the album, a major concert tour was held throughout the country, where the band enjoyed huge success with the audience.

=== The 1980s (1980–1989) ===
In 1980, the band found themselves without Enache, so Idu Barbu, the first keyboard player with the band (also, one of the founding members) was invited and joined in for recording a new single disc, Focuri vii/'49-'50 ("Live Flames/'49-'50"). The disc was still a great success with the audience, yet had only moderate success with the critics.

An EP was released the same year – Din nou acasă/Zmeul/Fetele albine ("Home again/The Kite/Little bee girls"). Partly resembling the Lume albă style, although more mature, it was thought of as a much better record than the single previously released the same year. When the Zalmoxe album was re-released on CD in 1993, it also included the EPs three songs as bonus tracks. Idu Barbu played the keyboards only on Fetele albine, a piece in 7/8 timing, combining ethnic influences with synthesizer effects. The other two songs feature Aldea himself on keyboards.

The band got again a contract to play in a nightclub in Belgium in 1981 and Dan Andrei Aldea decided to defect, and consequently requested political asylum. He never returned to Romania, even after the revolution in 1989, claiming disappointment with some of the political events in the early 1990s. He built his own recording studio in Munich, Germany and started working there as a producer, arranger and session musician.

Meanwhile, in 1982, a new singer and guitarist was brought into the band, Sorin Chifiriuc, who had just quit his own musical act, called Domino. Together with three keyboard players (of which, Sandu Grosu had been with them since 1974 as the band's sound engineer), Sfinx released their last album, which was untitled (except for the band's name, which was featured on the cover). This led some to take it as an eponymous album, while others called it for its blue cover, Albumul albastru ("The Blue Album", 1984). The style was very different from the previous records and ventured into some new wave, including an (uncredited) cover of Stranglers' Golden Brown as Într-un Cer Violet. As keyboardist Doru Apreotesei admitted in an interview, the producer forced the band to release the album right after the compositions were done, so they didn't have much time for rehearsals. The band later discovered that live renditions sounded much better than the studio version, as the members had not been accustomed to the songs well enough half a year before.

=== Into Sfinx Experience (1990 on) ===
The band's activity declined in the late 1980s, when new members (which now changed very often) started playing commercial-oriented music, as a consequence of the invitations the band received from discothèques abroad. Sfinx split into two different acts after 1989: "Bibi" Ionescu kept the original act's name, while Mişu Cernea formed Sfinx Experience. While Sfinx never performed again, the latter is still working today with a new line up (of which, Crina Mardare and Zoia Alecu previously played and sang in the 1985 Sfinx), except for the drummer, Mişu Cernea.

== Notable band members ==
- Corneliu "Bibi" Ionescu (electric bass) (died 2022)
- Octav Zemlicka (vocals, guitars)
- Idu Barbu (keyboards)
- Cristian Valica (drums)
- Petre Iordache (French horn)
- Sergiu Zagardan (drums)
- Toni Niculescu (keyboards)
- Adrian Ivaniţchi (guitars)
- Marian Toroimac (drums)
- Dan Andrei Aldea (vocals, guitars, keyboards, violin, recorder, harmonica) (died 2020)
- Silviu Hera (guitars)
- Doru Donciu (flute)
- Mişu Cernea (drums, vocals)
- Sandu Grosu (sound engineer, later keyboards)
- Dan Bădulescu (guitars, vocals)
- Nicolae Enache (keyboards)
- Sorin Chifiriuc (vocals, guitars, vocals)
- Doru Apreotesei (keyboards)
- Edwin Surin (keyboards)
- Mircea Romcescu (guitars)
- Florin Ochescu (guitars)
- Cristi Rus (guitars, vocals)
- Mihai Coman (keyboards, vocals)
- Doru Caplescu (keyboards)

== Discography ==
=== Studio albums ===
- Lume albă ("White world", 1975)
- Zalmoxe ("Zalmoxis", 1978)
- Albumul albastru ("The blue album", 1984)

=== Single discs and EPs ===
- Şir de cocori/Languir me fais ("Cranes' Pack/I yearn of you [o.fr.]", 1972)
- Coborîse primăvara/Ziua ta/Fiii soarelui/Peste vîrfuri ("Spring fell/Birthday/Sons of sun/Over crests", 1974)
- Focuri vii/'49-'50 ("Flames alive/'49-'50", 1980)
- Din nou acasă/Zmeul/Fetele albine ("Home again/The Kite/Little bee girls", 1980)

=== Compilation albums ===
- Formaţii rock nr. 4 ("Rock bands no. 4", 1979) – the disc belongs to the Formaţii de muzică uşoară series and it features two songs by Sfinx: Drumul ("The Path") and Lumină şi culoare ("Light and colour"). Lyrics for both songs were written by Cristina M. Ioan.
- Club A (1981) – this is a live album comprising a number of hits from various Romanian bands of the time, all recorded while performing in the Architecture Students' Club, Bucharest. Sfinx are featured with their 1980 number, Focuri vii.

=== Sfinx with Dida Drăgan ===
Around 1975, Sfinx had a short collaboration with Romanian singer Dida Drăgan. She had not yet had her disc debut, so her then-husband, Petre Magdin, offered her two compositions of his own. At that time, the Sfinx lineup was still that of Lume albă. Aldea wrote new arrangements for the two songs by Petre Magdin. Eventually, in 1975, a single disc called Glas de păduri|Trepte de lumină was released with vocals by Drăgan and Sfinx as the backing band.

=== Other recordings ===
Of the many songs by Sfinx considered lost (i.e., played mostly in concerts, and never recorded properly in a studio or, in some cases, never recorded at all), some survived on some unofficial recordings. However, those were not included on official discs or CDs. A quasi-chronologically ordered list of the most notable recordings would include:

- Îmi place muzica ("I like music", 1966) – one of the earliest successes of the band. Sfinx were invited to the Romanian Television, where they played this song together with a few covers (of which, the Beatles' Sgt. Pepper's Lonely Hearts Club Band).
- Purgatoriu ("Purgatory", 1972?) – instrumental piece recorded (low fidelity) at the Bulandra Theatre in Bucharest, shortly before Toroimac would leave the band. For a couple of years, Sfinx wrote and played music for stage from time to time. (Dan Andrei Aldea, however, was much more faithful to the world of theatre and had some notable projects in parallel to working with Sfinx.)
- Scufiţa roşie ("Little Red Riding Hood", 1980) – this was the only non-disc song which was featured on a CD (as a bonus track), that is, the Zalmoxe re-release in 1993. The song doesn't have a guitar part (only in the solo, where a discreet muted electric guitar is doubling the harmonica – both played by Aldea), but a piano resembling the Aldea style heard on Zmeul.
- Pasăre sură ("Leaden bird", 1982?)
- Întoarcerea ("The Return", 1984?) – this song is often mistaken for a track on Albumul albastru. It resembles very much the style of the album, but it was recorded outside it.
- "Cantecul blazonului", the blazon song, from 1970, kept in Radio Romania archive

== Bibliography ==
- Caraman Fotea, Daniela and Nicolau, Cristian (1999). Rock, Pop, Folk Dictionary, p. 18–19, 437–439. ISBN 973-28-0910-8
