= Guy Thomas (musician) =

French songwriter (1934–2020)

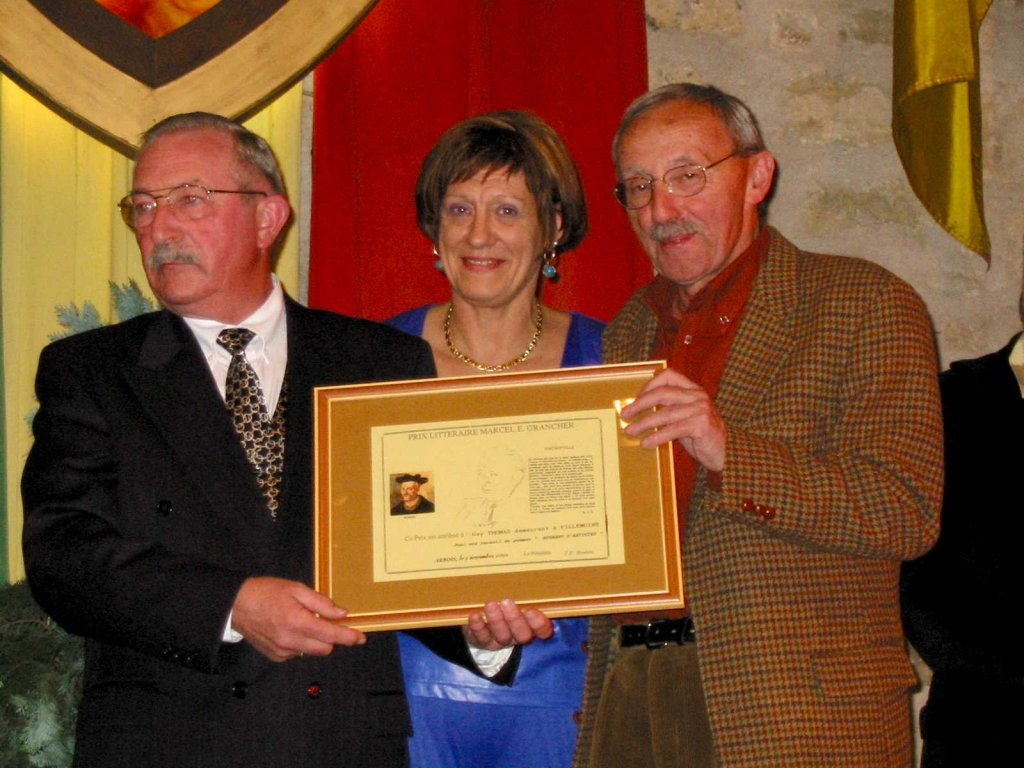
- Guy Thomas, on the right, during his presentation of the Marcel Grancher Literary Prize.
- Born: 9 July 1934; Verviers, Belgium
- Died: 19 January 2020 (aged 85); Lons-le-Saunier, France
- Occupation: Songwriter

Guy Thomas (9 July 1934 – 19 January 2020) was a Belgian-born French songwriter.

== Biography ==
Thomas was born in Belgium, the son of a Burgundian father and a Walloon mother. From a young age, he wrote poems, which were noticed by the likes of Léo Ferré, François Mauriac, Georges Brassens, and Jean Rostand. He moved to the village of Pillemoine and became a French teacher.

In 1960, he met François Cavanna, a co-founder of the satirical magazines Hara-Kiri and Charlie Hebdo, and collaborated with him. Thomas published his first book in 1969, titled Vers boiteux pour un aveugle.

Thomas wrote numerous songs for Jean Ferrat, Isabelle Aubret, Francesca Solleville, Jean-Marie Vivier, Zouzou Thomas, James Ollivier, and Claude Antonini.

Guy Thomas died on 19 January 2020 following lung problems.

== Publications ==
- Vers boiteux pour un aveugle (1969)
- Voyez comme on danse (1976)
- Les Aventures du poète Gugusse (1978)
- Goualantes du Pierrot bossu qui n'y voit que d'un œil (1984)
- Je ne suis qu'un cri (1985)
- Quand le bonheur est une orange (1997)
- Regards d'artistes (2000)
- Les Insolences d'un drôle de coco (2006)
- La Canaille se rebiffe (2008)
- Cot cot codec... et autres nouvelles sous la feuille à l'envers (2010)
- Sur un air de java vache ! (2011)
- Chevrotines et Folies douces (2013)

== Awards ==
- Prix Louis-Pergaud (2017)
