= Eduardo Bort =

Spanish guitarist (1948–2020)

- Birth name: Eduardo Bort Garcera
- Born: January 2, 1948; Valencia, Spain
- Died: February 26, 2020 (aged 72); Valencia, Spain
- Genres: Progressive rock
- Occupation(s): Guitarist, singer, songwriter, record producer
- Website: eduardobort.es

Eduardo Bort Garcera (January 2, 1948 – February 26, 2020) was a Spanish progressive rock guitarist, singer, songwriter and record producer.

== Life and career ==
Born in Valencia, Bort started his career in the late 1960s as guitarist in such bands as Los Exciters, Los Bodgies, and La Oveja Negra, before working as a session musician in Switzerland, Germany, Britain and France. After an unsuccessful collaboration with the Paris band Out, he returned to Spain.

In the early 1970s, Bort began to compose songs, inspired by the writings of H. P. Lovecraft and Lord Dunsany. He founded the band Yann with musicians Vicente "Fony" Font (lead vocals), José Soriano (keyboards), Marino Hernández (bass), and Vicente Alcañiz (drums). In Madrid in 1974, they recorded Bort's songs, with some lyrics by Juan Beltrán Pilato, for a demo version of what was intended to be the band's debut album. With Alcañiz, Bort took the tapes to London, where they were heard by EMI's A&R director Joop Visser. He was impressed and suggested that the album be re-recorded in London, and then promoted widely. However, none of the other musicians wished to move to Britain, and Visser lost interest. The album, self-titled Eduardo Bort and with re-recorded vocals by Bort, was eventually released on the Movieplay label in Spain in 1975. The release was poorly promoted, though Bort did perform its songs at several European music festivals.

Bort also worked as a record producer in the 1970s, on albums by Pau Riba and the band Iceberg. In 1983 he recorded his second album, Silvia, dedicated to his daughter who had died at a young age. It was released on Bort's own label, Bambule. He continued to perform and tour in Europe, Latin America, and Japan, and on one occasion performed for U.S. Marines heading for Vietnam on an aircraft carrier moored at Valencia. In 2012, he released the album Charly Buffalo, in honour of his friend Vicente Ausina.

Over several decades, Bort's debut album acquired a cult reputation, and copies changed hands for high prices. In 2019, the Teatro Principal de València hosted a tribute concert in his honour.

Bort died in Valencia in 2020, aged 72, from lung cancer.
