= The Immigrants (sculpture) =

Sculpture in Los Angeles, California, U.S.

- The sculpture in 2022
- Artist: Alberto Biasi
- Year: 1971
- Medium: Concrete; steel
- Location: Los Angeles, California, U.S.; 34°4′5.9″N 118°14′6.2″W

The Immigrants is a 1971 concrete and steel sculpture by Alberto Biasi, installed outside Los Angeles' Casa Italiana (1041 North Broadway), in the U.S. state of California.

== Description ==
The abstract sculpture is 14 feet tall and 40 feet wide, and depicts several people working with large machinery. There are multiple plaques with inscriptions. One reads "THE IMMIGRANTS". Another says, "THE HUDDLED / MASSES CAME / IN PURSUIT OF / HAPPINESS / AND STAKED / OUT FREEDOM'S / CLAIM / THEIR RESTLESS / HEIRS PUSH ON / MANKIND'S AN- / CESTRAL QUEST / FOR PEACE MUST / YET BE WON". A third plaque says "ALBERTO BIASI-SCULPTOR / 1971 / COMMISSIONED BY / THE PATRONS OF ITALIAN CULTURE / DIRECTORS 1970-71", followed by a list of names and "JOSEPH A. VERTRESS-FOUNDER".

== History ==
Commissioned by the Patrons of Italian Culture, the artwork was surveyed by the Smithsonian Institution's "Save Outdoor Sculpture!" program in 1995.

In 2013, Eric Brightwell of KCET said the artwork's allegorical figures "are intended to symbolize both gratitude and protestation against injustice, the industrialization of immigrant labor, and personal values. The figures in the sculpture are deliberately abstracted -- only the depiction of the hat of an Italian priest and the Italian flag that flies above give any obvious specific indication of the Italian-ness of the monument to all immigrants."
