= Julio Gallego =

Chilean footballer and manager

Personal information
- Full name: Julio Alejandro Gallego González
- Date of birth: 24 December 1947 (age 78)
- Place of birth: Chile
- Height: 1.74 m (5 ft 9 in)
- Position: Midfielder

Senior career*
Years	Team	Apps	(Gls)
1969	Audax Italiano	3	(0)
1970	San Antonio Unido		
1971–1974	Audax Italiano		
1975–1976	Luis Ángel Firpo		
- Rangers
- Deportes Arica
1981	Deportes La Serena		
1981	Deportivo del Valle		
1982	Milagro SC		
1983	San Antonio Unido		

International career
1973	Chile		
- * Club domestic league appearances and goals

Julio Alejandro Gallego González (born 24 December 1947), frequently referred as Julio Gallegos, is a Chilean former professional footballer who played as a midfielder for clubs in Chile, El Salvador and Ecuador.

== Career ==
Gallego's first club in the top level was Audax Italiano in 1969, staying with the club until 1973, having a stint with San Antonio Unido in 1970.

A well remembered player of San Antonio Unido, he won the Copa Isidro Corbinos in 1970, making 10 appearances and scoring 3 goals.

In Chile, he also played for Rangers, Deportes Arica and Deportes La Serena.

In 1981, he moved to Ecuador and played for Deportivo del Valle and Milagro Sporting Club at minor categories.

In 1973, he was called up to the Chile national team.

== After football ==
As a football coach, Gallego coached a youth team in a tournament called Del Pacífico a la Fama (From the Pacific Ocean to fame) in 1979. Then, he improved in Chile and abroad and has worked as coach at youth level for academies such as Lyons School.

He has led the Agrupación Social y Deportivo de Ex-Jugadores Profesionales San Antonio Unido (Social and Sports Association of Former Professional Players of San Antonio Unido).

== Honours ==
San Antonio Unido

- Copa Isidro Corbinos: 1970

Milagro SC

- Segunda Categoría: 1982
