= Bo Winberg =

Swedish singer and guitarist (1939–2020)

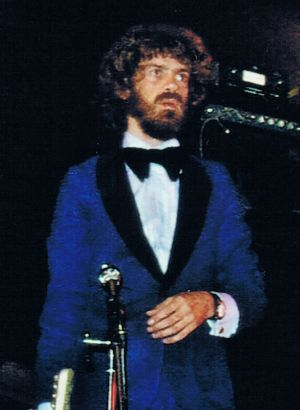
- Winberg In 1973

Background information
- Born: 27 March 1939; Gothenburg, Sweden
- Died: 3 January 2020 (aged 80) Sweden
- Genres: Pop; rock
- Occupations: Musician; actor
- Instrument: Guitar
- Formerly of: The Spotnicks

Bo Fredrik Winberg (27 March 1939 – 3 January 2020) was a Swedish singer and guitarist in the band The Spotnicks.

== Early life ==
Winberg was born in Gothenburg.

== The Spotnicks ==
The Spotnicks originated from a duo, "The Rebels" (1956), formed by Bo Starander (later known as Bob Lander) and Björn Thelin. Winberg was soon invited to join the group, and became "Rock-Teddy and the Blue Caps" in 1957. In 1958 they added Ove Johansson on drums, and changed their name to "The Frazers". They signed a recording contract in 1961, and changed their name to "The Spotnicks", a play on the Russian satellite Sputnik as suggested by their manager, Roland Ferneborg.

They became the first Swedish group to have international success. One of their early records, "Orange Blossom Special", became their first big international hit, making the Top 30 in the UK Singles Chart in 1962 on the Oriole label, and reaching No. 1 in Australia. Around this time they began wearing their trademark space suits on stage. They recorded their first album, The Spotnicks in London, Out-a Space, in 1962. Further hits included "Rocket Man" (based on the Soviet/Russian folk march "Polyushko-polye"), and "Hava Nagila".

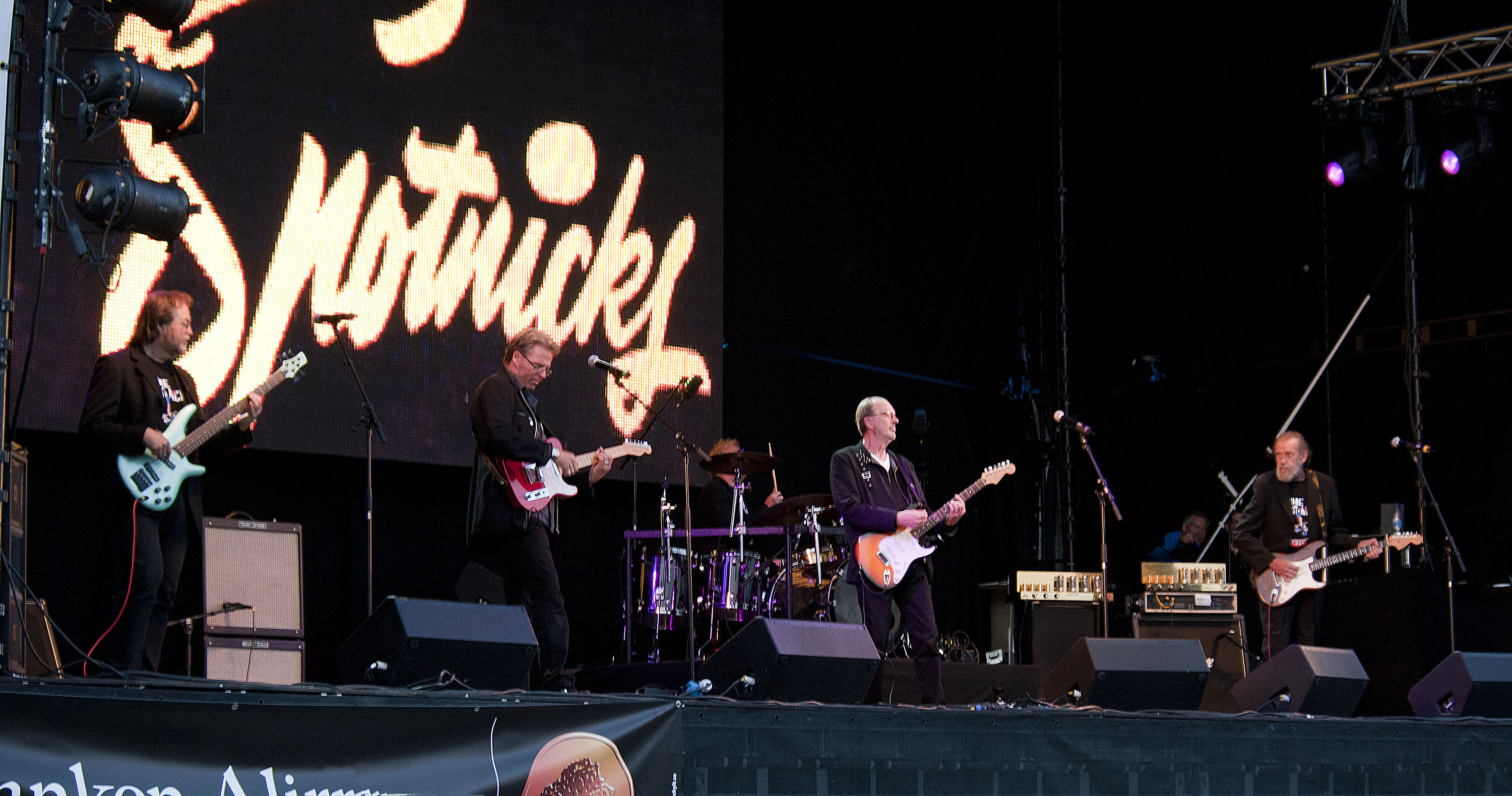
Winberg (far right) performing with the Spotnicks in Alingsås on 19 June 2010

The group, having undergone many personnel changes, split up in 1970 after releasing their fifteenth album, The Spotnicks Back in the Race. Yet the band was still popular in Japan, and it soon reformed under Winberg's control in 1971 at the request of a Japanese record label.

Winberg continued to lead versions of The Spotnicks, occasionally including Lander and/or Thelin, on tour and in recordings. In 2013, Winberg and Lander announced that they would be undertaking a final tour, finishing in May 2014.

The Spotnicks played their last concert on 30 March 2019, at Musikens Hus, Gothenburg.

== Death ==
Winberg died in Sweden on 3 January 2020 aged 80.
