= Dan Andrei Aldea =

Romanian musical artist (1950–2020)

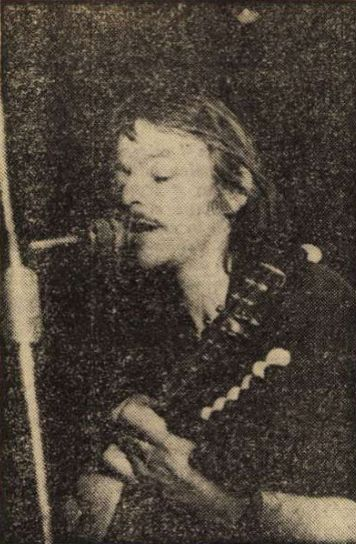
- Dan Andrei Aldea, 1975

Background information
- Birth name: Dan Andrei Vladimir Aldea
- Born: 9 March 1950; Bucharest, Romania
- Died: 18 January 2020 (aged 69); Fântâna Doamnei, Romania (buried Oltenița)
- Genres: Rock, Pop, Folk
- Occupations: Singer, composer
- Instruments: Guitar, violin, keyboard, bass, harmonica
- Formerly of: Sfinx; Saragossa Band

Dan Andrei Aldea (9 March 1950 – 18 January 2020) was a Romanian multi-instrumentalist (guitars, violin, and keyboards, mainly) and vocalist, best known for his work with the band Sfinx, but also for his solo career.

Aldea was born in Bucharest, where he graduated from the Music Academy, and was known as one of the best electric guitar players from Romania. Aldea has lived in Germany since 1981, after defecting. Just before defecting, he had played for several months in a night club in Belgium with his band Sfinx.

He lived in Munich Germany and worked as studio and session musician for several music labels. Also he had several music projects and was playing among other things from 2001 until 2004 with Franz Trojan co - founder of the music group „spider murphy gang“and „Stefan Späth“ in the Band „thezeitgeist.“

Along with Dorin Liviu Zaharia, he composed the music for the movie Nunta de piatră ("The Stone Wedding"). He died in Fântâna Doamnei, aged 69.
