= Maceo Woods =

American musical artist (1932–2020)

- Also known as: Rev. Maceo Woods
- Born: Maceo Len Woods; April 23, 1932; Chicago, Illinois, U.S.
- Died: January 11, 2020 (aged 87) Chicago, Illinois, U.S.
- Genres: Christian R&B gospel, traditional black gospel
- Occupations: Singer, songwriter
- Instruments: Vocals, singer-songwriter, organist
- Years active: 1959–2020
- Labels: Vee-Jay, Volt, Arista, Savoy, Meltone, P-Vine, Stax, Grammercy

Reverend Maceo Len Woods (April 23, 1932 – January 11, 2020) was an American gospel musician and noted organist, who founded the Christian Tabernacle Church. In 1954, he started his music career with the release of, Amazing Grace, that was released by Vee-Jay Records. His 25 releases spanned the course of 50 plus years in recording music, and he released albums with a myriad of noteworthy labels including; Vee-Jay Records, Volt Records, Arista Records, P-Vine Records, and Stax Records. The only work to place upon the Billboard magazine R&B Albums chart, with the release of Hello Sunshine in 1970 with Volt Records, and the song "Hello Sunshine" placed on the R&B Singles chart.

== Early life ==
Reverend Woods was born on April 23, 1932, in Chicago, Illinois, as Maceo Len Woods, and he is a celebrated organist, who founded Christian Tabernacle Church that is located on Prairie Avenue in Chicago.

== Music career ==
He started his recording music career in 1954, with the release of Amazing Grace by Vee-Jay Records, and it sold more than 200,000 copies. His only album to place on a Billboard magazine chart was Hello Sunshine that Volt Records released in 1970. This album placed at No. 45 on the R&B Albums chart at No. 45, and the song "Hello Sunshine" was No. 28 on the R&B Singles chart. He has released 25 albums with some noteworthy labels including; Vee-Jay Records, Volt Records, Arista Records, P-Vine Records, and Stax Records.

== Discography ==
List of studio albums, with selected chart positions
Title	Album details	Peak chart positions
Title	Album details	US R&B
Hello Sunshine	Released: 1970; Label: Volt; CD, digital download	45
