= HaOlim =

HaOlim העולים
- Leader: Yigal Yasinov
- Founded: 1 February 2006
- Dissolved: 1 February 2006
- Split from: Shinui
- Merged into: Yisrael Beiteinu
- Most MKs: 1 (2006)
- Fewest MKs: 1 (2006)

HaOlim (Hebrew: העולים, lit. The Immigrants) was a short-lived one-man political faction in Israel.

== Background ==
The faction was formed when Yigal Yasinov broke away from Shinui on 1 February 2006, towards the end of the 16th Knesset. This followed Shinui's split into Shinui and the Secular Faction.

On the same day of its establishment, Yasinov merged the party into Yisrael Beiteinu, which had split from the National Union on the same day. Yasinov himself had immigrated from Ukraine in 1993 and had joined Shinui rather than Yisrael Beiteinu after being refused permission to buy a house by settlers during the 1990s, an episode which led to a dislike of the National Religious Party. Yasinov was placed 14th on the Yisrael Beiteinu list for the 2006 elections, but failed to retain his place in the Knesset as it won only 11 seats.
