= Sergio Bassi =

Italian singer-songwriter (1949–2020)

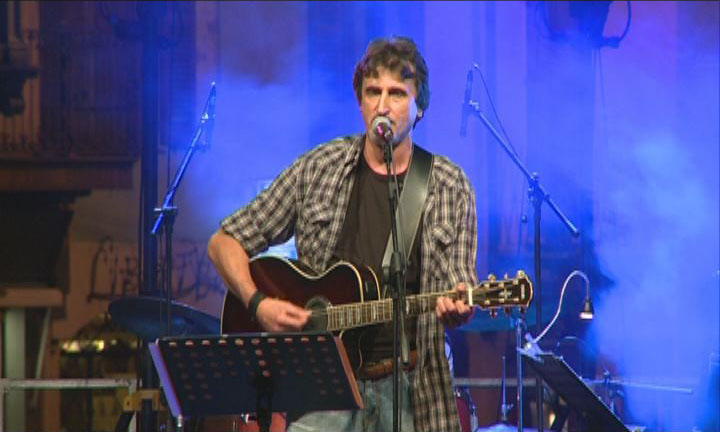

Background information
- Born: 23 June 1949
- Origin: Codogno, Italy
- Died: 15 March 2020 (aged 70) Crema, Italy
- Genres: folk rock
- Occupation: singer-songwriter
- Instrument: guitar
- Years active: 1982–2020
- Website: www.sergiobassi.it

Sergio Bassi (23 June 1949 – 15 March 2020) was an Italian folk singer-songwriter.

== Biography ==
Sergio was raised by his maternal grandparents in a small hamlet in Codogno, Lombardy. After adulthood, he moved to Legnano, later to Piacenza, then he lived in San Francesco al Campo for seven years. Later, he returned to his hometown.

During the COVID-19 pandemic in Italy, he contracted novel coronavirus. He died from the infection in Crema on 15 March 2020.

== Discography ==
=== Single ===
- 1982 – Una città su misura (45 GIRI)
- 2011 – Il Mantovano Volante (CD AUDIO) Museo Tazio Nuvolari
- 2016 – Inno a Santa Francesca Cabrini (CD AUDIO)

=== Album ===
- 1984 – Fermati Guerriero
- 1985 – Ali per volare
- 1986 – Cambio di stagioni
- 1989 – L'Equilibrista (prima versione LP 33 giri)
- 1993 – Storie Padane & non... (prima versione in cassetta non-pubblicata)
- 2003 – Storie padane & non...
- 2004 – L'Equilibrista
- 2006 – E Il fiume sta a guardare...
- 2007 – Cavallo Pazzo
- 2011 – I Cieli della Terra
- 2015 – Identità Musica & Parole
- 2017 – Una zolla di terra – Antologia
