= The Spotnicks =

Swedish instrumental rock group

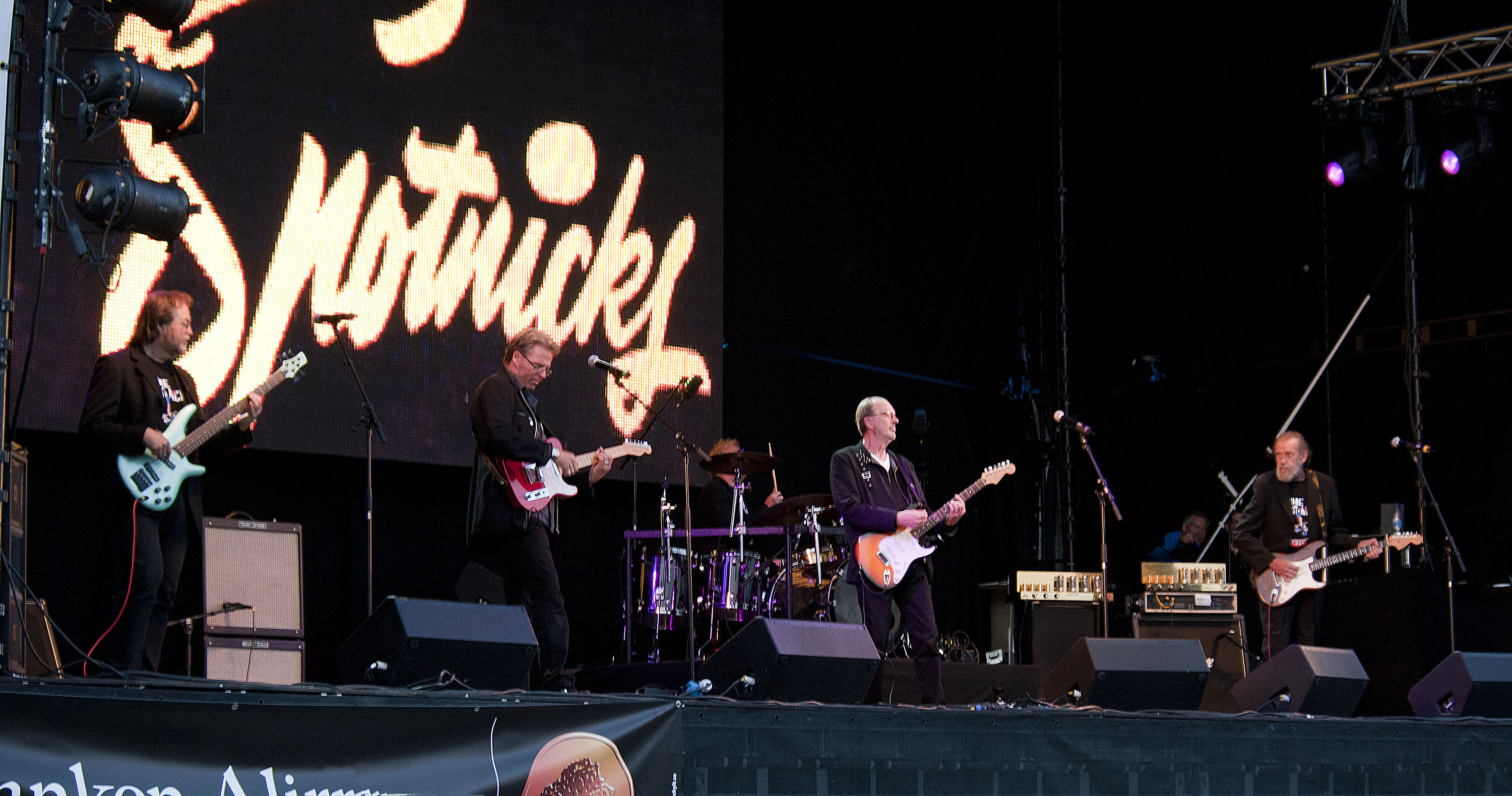
- The Spotnicks 2010

Background information
- Also known as: Rock-Teddy and The Blue Caps; The Frazers
- Origin: Gothenburg, Sweden
- Genres: instrumental rock, space rock
- Years active: 1958–2019
- Labels: Karusell, Oriole, Polydor, SweDisc, Interdisc
- Members: Stefan Möller; Kent Brännlund; Göran Sannfridsson
- Past members: Bob Lander (Bo Starander); Bo Winberg; Björn Thelin; Ove Johansson; Peter Winsnes; Derek Skinner; Jimmie Nicol; Tommy Tausis; Magnus Hellsberg; Göran Samuelsson; Lennart Hermansson; Bernt Andersson; Magnus Hellsberg; Juri Wiik; Claes Pettersson; Johan Dielemanns, Matz Nilsson; Bo Maniette; Peter Wiberg; Håkan Mjörnheim; Mats Björklund; Leif Paulsén; Torgny Stoor; Peter Milefors; Gunnar Winald; Anders Erixon; Kenth Andersson; Lasse Öhberg; Arne Österlindh; Nils Nordin; Alf Brink; Stefan Eriksson; Magnus Rosén; Dennis Nybratt; Fredrik Oscarsson; Douglas Möller
- Website: http://spotnicks.net/

The Spotnicks were an instrumental rock group from Sweden that formed in 1961. They were known for wearing "space suit" costumes on stage and for their innovative electronic guitar sound. They released 43 albums.

== History ==
The Spotnicks originated from a duo, "The Rebels" (1956), formed by Bo Starander (11 March 1942 – 3 May 2020; rhythm guitar, vocals), and Björn Thelin (27 June 1942 – 24 January 2017; bass guitar). They were joined by lead guitarist Bo Winberg (27 March 1939, Gothenburg, Sweden – 3 January 2020), and became "Rock-Teddy and the Blue Caps" in 1957 in Gothenburg. In 1958 they added Ove Johansson (drums) (30 March 1940 – 8 April 2017), changed their name to "The Frazers", and began playing regularly in local clubs. They signed a recording contract in 1961, and changed their name to "The Spotnicks", a play on the Russian satellite Sputnik as suggested by their manager, Roland Ferneborg. Starander was later known as Bob Lander.

They soon became the first Swedish group to have significant international success, in a similar style to The Shadows and The Ventures. They toured Europe, and one of their early records, "Orange Blossom Special", became their first big international hit, making the Top 30 in the UK Singles Chart in 1962 on the Oriole label, and reaching No. 1 in Australia. The Spotnicks achieved huge success in Japan, Europe, Australia and Latin America where they became The Shadows' biggest rivals in instrumental music. Around this time they began wearing their trademark "space suits" on stage. They recorded their first album, The Spotnicks in London, Out-a Space, in 1962. Further hits included "The Rocket Man" (based on the Soviet/Russian folk march "Polyushko-polye"), and "Hava Nagila" (their biggest UK hit, where it made it to No. 13). Winberg also recorded solo, credited as 'The Shy Ones'.

In 1963, "Amapola" became one of their most successful singles in their home country, staying at No. 1 in Sweden for eight weeks. They appeared in the film Just for Fun, continued to tour widely, and recorded their second album, The Spotnicks in Paris. That year, drummer Ove Johansson left and was replaced by an Englishman, Derek Skinner (born 5 March 1942, London). Two years later, Skinner was replaced briefly by Jimmie Nicol, who had drummed with The Beatles on the Danish, Dutch and Australian legs of their 1964 tour, while Ringo Starr recovered from having his tonsils removed.

In 1964 and 1965, The Spotnicks expanded their popularity in Germany, Japan, and Norway, reaching No. 1 in Norway in 1965 with the single "Blue Blue Day" which was also certified Silver for more than 25,000 copies sold, and No. 1 in Japan in 1966 with the single "Karelia". In 1968, the band released an album in Japan titled The Spotnicks Deluxe which was certified Gold for more than one million copies sold. Elsewhere, however, they became less successful as popular music tastes changed. In 1965 the band was joined by organist and vocalist Peter Winsnes (born 9 March 1944, Molndal, Sweden). Nicol left in February 1967 and was replaced by Tommy Tausis (22 March 1946 – 30 March 2022). Thelin also left in 1967 and was replaced by Magnus Hellsberg (born 6 November 1944). Winsnes left in 1968 and organist Goran Samuelsson joined in 1969. The group, having undergone many personnel changes, split up in 1970 after releasing their fifteenth album, The Spotnicks Back in the Race. Yet the band was still popular in Japan, and it soon reformed under Winberg's control in 1971 at the request of a Japanese record label.

Winberg continued to lead versions of The Spotnicks, occasionally including Lander and/or Thelin, on tour and in recordings, and the band was still active in the mid-1980s. In 2013, Winberg and Lander announced that they would be undertaking a final tour, finishing in May 2014. The Spotnicks played their very last concert on 30 March 2019, at Musikens Hus, Gothenburg.

Johansson died on 8 April 2017. Winberg died on 3 January 2020. Lander died on 3 May 2020. Tausis died on 30 March 2022.

== Discography ==
=== Albums ===
- The Spotnicks in London, Out-a Space (1962), UK No. 20.
- The Spotnicks in Paris, Dansons avec les Spotnicks (1963), FRA No. 5.
- The Spotnicks in Spain "Bailemos con los Spotnicks" (1963), GER No. 33.
- Devenez soliste des Spotnicks (1963)
- The Spotnicks (1964), GER No. 45
- Meet The Spotnicks (1964), GER No. 14
- The Spotnicks in Stockholm (1964)
- The Spotnicks in Berlin (1964)
- The Spotnicks at Home in Gothenburg (1965)
- The Spotnicks in Tokyo (1966), JPN No. 4.
- The Spotnicks Around the World (1966), SWE No. 9.
- The Spotnicks in Winterland (1966)
- The Spotnicks (1967)
- The Spotnicks Live in Japan (1967)
- Den Röda Brandbilen (1967)
- The Spotnicks in Acapulco Mexico (1967)
- The Spotnicks Deulxe (1968), JPN Gold for more than one million copies sold.
- The Spotnicks in the Groove (1968)
- The Spotnicks By Request (1968)
- The Spotnicks "Back in the Race" (1970)
- The Spotnicks "Ame no ballad" (1971)
- The Spotnicks "Something Like Country" (1972), GER No. 14
- The Spotnicks in Japan (1973)
- Bo Winberg & The Spotnicks "Today" (1973)
- The Spotnicks Plays Great Hits of Japanese Tunes (1973)
- The Spotnicks Live in Berlin '74 (1974)
- The Spotnicks "Feelings – 12 Brandnew Songs" (1976)
- The Spotnicks "Charttoppers Recorded 77" (1977)
- The Spotnicks "The Great Snowman" (1978), SWE No. 42
- The Spotnicks "Never Trust Robots" (1978)
- The Spotnicks "Saturday Night Music" (1979)
- The Spotnicks "Pink Lady Super Hits" (1979)
- The Spotnicks "20th Anniversary Album" (1979)
- The Spotnicks "20th Anniversary Album" (1980)
- The Spotnicks "We Don't Wanna Play Amapola No More" (1982)
- The Spotnicks "In the Middle of Universe" (1983)
- The Spotnicks "Highway Boogie" (1985)
- The Spotnicks "In Time" (1986)
- The Spotnicks "Love Is Blue" (1987)
- The Spotnicks "Happy Guitar (1987), AUT No. 7, GER No. 2
- The Spotnicks "16 Golden World Hits" (1987)
- The Spotnicks "Unlimited" (1989)
- The Spotnicks/Bo Winberg No. 1 (1993)
- The Spotnicks "Tracks" (1995)
- The Spotnicks 1997 (1997)
- The Spotnicks Live 1999 (1999)
- The Otherside (Of the Moon) (2002)
- Back to the Roots (2003)
- Still on Tour (2006)
- Bo Winberg / My Own Favorite (2009)
- The 'Real' Amapola (2011)

=== Chart extended plays ===
| Year | EP | Record label/Cat No. | Chart Positions | |
| Year | EP | Record label/Cat No. | FRA | UK |
|---|---|---|---|---|
| 1963 | "Orange Blossom Special" / "The Spotnicks Theme" / "Galloping Guitars" / "The Rocket Man" | President Records | 3 | — |
| 1963 | "Spotnicks Theme" / "Johnny Guitar" | President Records | 9 | — |
| 1963 | On The Air | Oriole Records / EP-7075 | — | 2 |
| 1963 | The Spotnicks In Paris | Oriole Records / EP-7078 | — | 17 |
"—" denotes an EP that did not chart or was not released in the territory.

=== Chart singles ===
| Year | Single | Chart Positions | | | | | | | | | | |
| Year | Single | SWE | AUS | BE (Fl) | BE (W) | FIN | FRA | GER | JPN | NLD | NOR | UK |
|---|---|---|---|---|---|---|---|---|---|---|---|---|
| 1961 | "Johnny Guitar" | — | — | 6 | 5 | 2 | 13 | — | — | — | — | — |
| 1961 | "Galloping Guitars" | — | — | — | 12 | — | — | — | — | — | — | — |
| 1961 | "Spotnicks Theme" | — | — | — | 12 | — | — | — | — | — | — | — |
| 1961 | "Orange Blossom Special" | — | 1 | 6 | 9 | — | 34 | — | — | — | — | 29 |
| 1962 | "Rocket Man" | — | — | — | — | — | — | — | — | — | — | 38 |
| 1962 | "Telstar" | — | — | — | 6 | — | 7 | — | — | — | — | — |
| 1962 | "Amapola" | 1 | 81 | 9 | 33 | — | — | — | — | 7 | — | — |
| 1962 | "Ol' Man River" | 16 | — | — | — | — | — | — | — | — | — | — |
| 1962 | "Drina" | 12 | — | — | — | — | — | — | — | 5 | — | — |
| 1962 | "Hava Nagila" | — | 10 | — | — | — | — | — | — | — | — | 13 |
| 1963 | "Carry Me Back" | — | — | — | Tip | — | — | — | — | — | — | — |
| 1963 | "Last Space Train" | — | — | — | Tip | — | — | — | — | — | — | — |
| 1963 | "Just Listen To My Heart" | 8 | — | — | — | — | — | — | — | — | — | 36 |
| 1963 | "Spanish Gypsy Dance" | 19 | — | — | — | — | — | — | — | — | — | — |
| 1963 | "Take Five" | — | — | — | Tip | — | 7 | — | — | — | — | — |
| 1964 | "Moonshot" | — | — | — | — | — | — | 46 | — | — | — | — |
| 1964 | "Papa Oom Mow Mow" | 6 | — | — | — | — | — | — | — | — | — | — |
| 1965 | "Blue Blue Day" | — | — | — | — | — | — | — | — | — | 1 | — |
| 1965 | "Le Dernier Train De L'Espace" | — | — | — | — | — | — | — | 2 | — | — | — |
| 1965 | "Ajomies" | — | — | — | — | — | — | — | 1 | — | — | — |
| 1965 | "Karelia" | — | — | — | — | — | — | — | 1 | — | — | — |
| 1966 | "Sentimental Guitar" | — | — | — | — | — | — | — | 5 | — | — | — |
| 1966 | "Dreaming Guitar" | — | — | — | — | — | — | — | 10 | — | — | — |
| 1967 | "Old Clock At Home" | — | — | — | — | — | — | — | 3 | — | — | — |
| 1967 | "Moscow" | — | — | — | — | — | — | — | 10 | — | — | — |
| 1972 | "If You Could Read My Mind" | — | — | — | — | — | — | 2 | — | — | — | — |
| 1973 | "Speak Softly Love" | — | — | — | — | — | — | 41 | — | — | — | — |
"—" denotes a single that did not chart or was not released in the territory.

== Legacy ==
Swedish band The Spacemen, who released albums and singles on Rainbow Music and Triola Records from 1988 to 2018, were heavily influenced by The Spotnicks, not only covering their songs but writing their own guitar instrumental music in the same style as The Spotnicks. Notable Spotnicks cover bands include The Goldfingers from Sweden who released the album Destination Moon in 2001 and who were invited to perform at a Spotnicks festival that was organised by Spotnicks drummer Ove Johansson, and Apollo 11 from France.

In Record Collector's Rare Record Price Guide 2020, The Spotnicks' releases, if in "mint" condition, amongst others were valued at £20 for the EP, On The Air, £20 for the EP, Spotnicks In Paris, £20 for the EP, Spotnicks At The Olympia Paris, £25 for the monaural album, Outa Space The Spotnicks In London, £35 for the stereo album, Outa Space The Spotnicks In London, £30 for the album The Spotnicks In Spain and £30 for the album, The Spotnicks In Berlin.
