= Peter Wieland =

German singer (1930–2020)

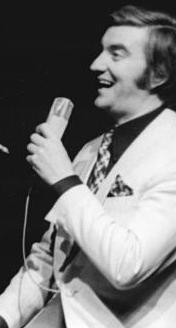
- Peter Wieland (right) at the Expo 73
- Born: Ralf Sauer; 6 July 1930; Stralsund, Weimar Republic
- Died: 2 March 2020 (aged 89); Berlin, Germany
- Occupation: Singer

Peter Wieland (stage name of Ralf Sauer; 6 July 1930 – 2 March 2020) was a German singer.

== Biography ==
The Sauer family left Stralsund following World War II, moving to Köthen. Here, Ralf trained as a carpenter. His musical talent was discovered at his local church, and he subsequently won a choir competition in the mid-1950s. He studied at the Hochschule für Musik "Hanns Eisler", where he trained as an opera baritone. He became an opera singer at the theatre in Neustrelitz for three years, and then branched out into other genres of music. In 1957, he took the stage name Peter Wieland.

Wieland began working at the music review Das goldene Prag and began a long acting career at the Friedrichstadt-Palast. After the fall of East Germany, Wieland appeared on television programs, such as Sommermelodien, Weihnachten bei uns, and Gute Zeiten, schlechte Zeiten. In 1999 and 2000, he played the role of Emperor François-Joseph in the operetta L'Auberge du Cheval-Blanc.

Peter Wieland died on 2 March 2020 at the age of 89.

== Discography ==
- Weißer Winterwald among others.
