= Dolores Abril =

Spanish singer and actress (1939–2020)

- Abril in 1966
- Born: Dolores Caballero Abril; 9 May 1935; Hellín, Spain
- Died: 25 October 2020 (aged 81); Espartinas, Spain
- Occupations: Singer, actress
- Spouse: Juanito Valderrama (1981–2004)
- Children: Juan Antonio Valderrama; Juana Dolores Valderrama Caballero
- Musical career
- Genres: Copla

Dolores Caballero Abril (9 May 1935 – 25 October 2020) was a Spanish singer and actress.

== Biography ==
Dolores Abril specialized in the genre of copla. She was romantically and professionally partnered with singer-songwriter Juanito Valderrama from 1954 until his death in 2004. Together they released numerous albums, most notably Peleas en broma, and toured Spain with various shows such as Voces de España (1962), Mano a mano (1963), Su Majestad la alegría (1967), and Revolera en el Price (1968).

Among her solo discography, the singles "Al primer derrote" (1959), "Tú te casate" (1961), "Gloria a Chicuelo II" (1962), "Miguel de la Cruz Romero" (1963), and "Qué bonita está la Reina" (1963) stand out.

As for her film career, she starred with Valderrama in the films El emigrante (1960), Gitana (1965), De barro y oro (1966), La niña del patio (1967), and El padre Coplillas (1968).

In 2009 she was awarded the "Claveles de la Prensa" prize by the Press Association of Seville.

She was the mother of singers Juan Antonio Valderrama and Juana Dolores Valderrama.

On 25 October 2020 after living secluded for many years, Abril died in Seville at the age of 81.
