= Hellmut Stern =

German violinist (1928–2020)

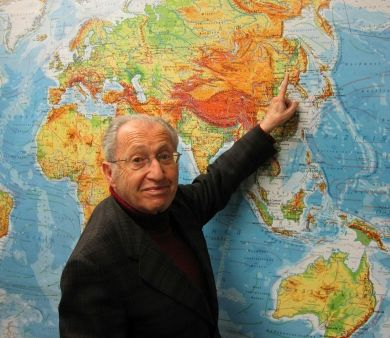
- In a 2011 lecture, Stern points on a map to Harbin, China, to which his family escaped
- Born: 21 May 1928; Berlin, Germany
- Died: 21 March 2020 (aged 91); Berlin, Germany
- Occupation: Classical violinist
- Organizations: Berlin Philharmonic
- Awards: Order of Merit of the Federal Republic of Germany

Hellmut Stern (21 May 1928 – 21 March 2020) was a German violinist who played principal violin with the Berlin Philharmonic. He published his autobiography in 1990, narrating his life in exile in China from 1938, Israel from 1949, and the U.S. from 1956, and his return to Berlin in 1961. Through his membership of the board of the Berlin Philharmonic, he initiated the orchestra's first tour to Israel.

== Biography ==
Hellmut Stern was born in Berlin into a Jewish family. His father, Dittmar Stern, was a voice teacher, and his mother, Ilse Rose Stern, was a pianist. His mother taught him to play the piano from age five. He attended a Jewish school in Wilmersdorf, where a patron donated a violin to the most gifted pupil, which he received at age nine. The family tried to emigrate beginning in 1933. After the November Pogrom in 1938, they escaped from Berlin to Harbin, now in China, where his mother had received a fictitious contract as a pianist. In exile, Stern helped the family income as a pianist and violinist, playing in bars, nightclubs and hotels. In 1948, the family immigrated to Israel. As a bar pianist at the King David Hotel in Jerusalem in 1951, he met Isaac Stern, who arranged for him audition for the Israel Philharmonic Orchestra in Tel Aviv. He won his first orchestral post as a second violinist.

His parents were unable to make a living in Israel, and in spring 1956 moved to the U.S. Although Stern had planned to stay in Israel, when his father became seriously ill, he followed his parents to the U.S., in December of the same year. Without a work permit, he again had to take occasional jobs. In 1958, he was taken on by the St. Louis Symphony Orchestra, and later played with the Rochester Philharmonic Orchestra and the New York State Orchestra.

In 1961, Stern returned to (then West) Berlin, which he still regarded as his home.

Stern joined the Berlin Philharmonic as a first violinist, and remained with the orchestra for 34 years; he became principal violinist in 1986. He was a member of the orchestra's board (Orchestervorstand) from 1969. He played with many leading conductors of the time, especially with Herbert von Karajan. He participated in many recordings and was a soloist in several concerts, like the Humoristisches Festkonzert celebrating the orchestra's centenary in 1982, conducted by Vicco von Bülow (Loriot). He was part of efforts to organize a tour of the orchestra to Israel, first beginning in 1967, when the orchestra would have been welcome, but not Karajan. In 1990, with the orchestra conducted by Daniel Barenboim, his dream came true. The orchestra played several concerts, especially a joint concert with the Israel Philharmonic Orchestra conducted by Zubin Mehta. Stern was awarded the Order of Merit of the Federal Republic of Germany in 1993 by Richard von Weizsäcker. He retired in 1994.

After his retirement, Stern worked in schools to teach young people about the dangers of fascism and dictatorship, describing himself as a "professional witness" (Zeitzeuge).

Stern published his autobiography, Saitensprünge in 1990. He died in Berlin on 21 March 2020 at the age of 91.

== Published works ==
- Saitensprünge – Erinnerungen eines leidenschaftlichen Kosmopoliten. Aufbau Verlag, Berlin 2000. ISBN 978-3-7466-1684-1.
- Weil ich überall auf der Welt zu Hause bin by David Dambitsch, audio book, memories of Stern and Barenboim, Airplay-Entertainment, 2007. ISBN 978-3-935168-64-9.
