= List of Romanian jazz musicians =

A list of Romanian jazz musicians (sorted alphabetically by last name).

B

- Lucian Ban (piano)

E

- Teodora Enache (vocals)

G

- Radu Goldiş (guitar)
- Eugen Gondi (drums)

K

- János Kőrössy (piano)

L

- Luiza Zan (Vocals)

N

- Florin Niculescu (violin)

P

- Anca Parghel (Vocals)
- Marius Popp (piano)

R

- Johnny Răducanu (bass, piano)

S

- Cristian Soleanu (tenor sax, alto sax)

T

- Harry Tavitian (piano, vocals)
- Mircea Tiberian (piano)

U

- Aura Urziceanu (Vocals)

W

- Peter Wertheimer (saxophone, clarinet, flute)
