= Mircea Florian (musician) =

Romanian musician and artist

- Also known as: Florian din Transilvania; M. A. N. Florian; FloriMan
- Born: December 5, 1949 (age 76); Satu Mare, Romania
- Genres: Folk revival, folk rock, avant-garde jazz, psychedelic music, psych-folk, acoustic rock, experimental rock, progressive rock, minimal music, aleatoric music, new wave
- Occupations: Musician, visual artist, engineer, computer scientist, academic, activist, actor
- Instruments: Vocals, guitar, acoustic guitar, cobza, flute, blockflute, drums, synthesizer, jaw harp, idiophones, mandolin, guitalele, saxophone
- Years active: 1965–present
- Label: Electrecord

Mircea Florian (Romanian: [ˈmirtʃe̯a floriˈan]; born December 5, 1949), also known as Florian din Transilvania, M. A. N. Florian, and FloriMAN, is a Romanian multi-instrumentalist musician, multimedia artist and computer scientist, based in Germany. Having started his musical career as a folk rock singer, in the late 1960s, he developed a fusion between Romanian folklore and Eastern music, especially Indian sound, moving into psychedelic music. He founded Ceata Melopoică ensemble, with whom he recorded a concept album. These and his solo acts earned him a cult following among rebellious youth, establishing his reputation as one of the most original contributors to Romanian pop music. Florian was also an early member of Cenaclul Flacăra, a traveling music and literature circle, but parted with it when it became increasingly nationalistic.

Before 1980, Florian was turning his attention to electronic music and new wave. In parallel, like other artists on the Romanian folk scene, he was pursuing his interest in non-pop ventures, from experimental rock and minimal music to biomusic, and exhibiting his installation art. In 1986, Florian escaped Communist Romania, having by then been exposed to much communist censorship, and took up cultural and scientific projects in West Germany. Since the Romanian Revolution, he has made frequent returns, playing at numerous festivals and composing film scores.

== Biography ==
=== Beginnings ===
Born in Satu Mare, Mircea Florian began his musical education as a pianist and saxophonist, before turning to guitar, blockflute, mandolin and various other instruments. He first took classes at the Satu Mare Art School, and first became interested in performing arts while an avid spectator of the local Medrano Circus (the place where he also witnessed the first concert by a rock band).

Florian then studied at the Eminescu High School, where he had musical appearances with the band Zburătorii (1965). A while after, he also gave his first one-man show, which included a dance routine. In parallel to state-run education, he took private courses in music and visual arts. Florian first came into contact with the burgeoning hippie movement of the West, and met Romanians who, despite facing tight scrutiny from the communist authorities, wanted to replicate it locally. In 2005, he stated that the fundamental difference was in the drug culture, which Romanians had little access to, adding: "In any case the manner in which the artistic act was supposed to be carried out here was different from what one could experience in the West. Romanian artists created for a tighter circle, of (proper) connoisseurs." Elsewhere, he also noted that hippie culture was essentially becoming more accessible to Romanians by the end of the 1960s: "I remember that, once a record came out, fresh off the Western market, no more than a week would pass before it got to Romania, brought over by some sailor or an acquaintance who had been visiting 'out on the outside', or through heaven knows what channels..."

Among the decade's pop acts, Florian was most impressed by Bob Dylan, The Beatles and Leonard Cohen. At the time, he became an avid listener of clandestine Western radio, where he first heard the music of Karlheinz Stockhausen, Steve Reich and especially Luigi Nono: "Nono's music was so new, so captivating, so rich in meanings... I got hooked on it forever!" He carried out his first experiments with electronic music at the age of 16, when, in his search for new "tone colors", he turned a sound generator into a keyboard instrument.

Zburătorii disbanded in 1967, and Florian left Satu Mare for Bucharest, the capital. He studied cybernetics at the Politehnica University, from 1967 to 1972, and was part of the first-ever graduating class at Politehnica's Faculty of Economic Calculations. After arriving in Bucharest, he played for a while with a band called Lotus, which, he recalls, was a "pretty interesting" folk project. In 1968, during the invasion of Czechoslovakia, Florian also had his first brush-in with communist censorship: a song of his, which was transparently critical of the Soviet Union, was banned from public radio. According to popular account, DJ Cornel Chiriac ignored such commands and played the song, being promptly sacked as a result (the other version attributes his dismissal to having played The Beatles' ambiguous record "Back in the U.S.S.R.").

Lotus' major breakthrough came in 1969, when they performed at the 3-Gaură-3 Club, where music critic Florin Silviu Ursulescu organized Romania's first American folk-inspired music festival. As noted by Florian, Lotus appeared alongside the "first wave" of Romanian folk singers, among them Mircea Vintilă, Dorin Liviu Zaharia and Doru Stănculescu. At around the same time, Florian joined the Luceafărul literary club, and provided the avant-garde jazz background to the Surrealistic poems recited live by Valery Oisteanu.

In parallel, Florian's work in mathematics opened new fields for his musical experimentation. The major factor, he notes, was his familiarization with transistor computers at the Economic Calculations laboratory and the Bucharest Academy of Economic Studies, during an era of "sheer luck"—that is, when liberalization allowed Romania to trade in electronics with the United States. He had a free hand to work in algorithmic composition and computer music. He was officially employed by the computer industry from age 22, supplementing his salary with semi-compulsory dispatches "on location", which allowed him to invest his own money in various cutting-edge musical instruments.

=== Florian în Labirint to Ceata Melopoică ===
By 1971, Mircea Florian had grown dissatisfied with the band concept, and committed himself mainly to solo projects. As such, in what he calls his "white period" of acoustic rock, he notably became the opening act for the celebrated rock band Phoenix. He also played at the Ion Mincu University hangout, Club A, in live concerts with Vintilă and actor-singer Florian Pittiş. The coincidence of names with the latter was a running joke, and it was here that he began using the stage name Florian din Transilvania (literally, "Florian from Transylvania"). It has endured as one of the singer's main pseudonyms, alongside M. A. N. Florian.

His focus was on playing string instruments such as guitar or cobza, as well as being a singer-songwriter. He established a concept-band, known initially as Florian în Labirint ("Florian in the Labyrinth"), and later as Ceata de dubaşi, ceteraşi, kitarozi şi alţi meşteri lăutari ("A Band of Drummers, Cittern-players, Guitarists and Other Master Lăutari"), and also involving Gabi Căciulă and Sorin Chifiriuc as guitarists and Alexandru Beno as violinist. The project broke musical ground when it added Indian influences and sitar backing, which was contributed by Ljubiša Ristić, of Yugoslavia. The occasional tabla rhythm and flute melodies were played by a Pakistani performer, Arif Djafri.

The music was described by Florian as combining "archaic and electric elements" into "a science", and covering successive colored "periods" in his creative history, when he was into amassing musical instruments. The new Western inspirations on his work were Laurie Anderson, Peter Gabriel and Todd Rundgren. Emerging from the core group of Florian în Labirint, Ceata Melopoică ("The Melo-poetic Band") became Florian's main project of the 1970s. Its often-changing membership included: Beno, Căciulă, Chifiriuc, Ristić, Zaharia, Andrei Oişteanu, Alexandru Beno, Valentin Andronescu, Günther Reininger, Andrei Cristea, Eugen Gondi, Dietrich Krauser, Mihai Creţu, Costin Petrescu, Alexandru Mitaru, Alexe Conta, Mircea Dordoi, Ortansa Păun, Sorin Baroţi, Gheorghe Popescu and Mihai Pintilie.

From its choice of name, this new project also reflected its leader's mounting interest in Ancient Greek philosophy, the ideological source of his psych-folk, which he describes as more profound than generic folk rock. He referred to his earlier folk songs as "singable" and "more accessible" than his later work. Although psychedelic music was not well seen in Communist Romania in the 1970s, Florian's psych-folk earned a cult following. According to critic Mihai Plămădeală, there was a transition at the end of which Florian became "one of the most peculiar Romanian musicians": "While he started his career as a folk-singer, with several calm and usual songs, Florian slowly began to get distance from standard means of expression."

=== Protest singer ===
There was a political aspect to Florian's reputation. He later spoke about the cultural shock at the end of liberalization, when the July Theses introduced Sino-North Korean-style state control. As noted by critic Marius Chivu, Florian's opposition to the communist regime led him into "the great quad of folk protest singers", with Nicu Vladimir, Valeriu Sterian and Horia Stoicanu. For a while, he was a presence at Cenaclul Flacăra, the folk-singing club organized with communist approval. The singer later stated that he was one of the club's founding members, together with poet Adrian Păunescu, his colleague at Luceafărul, and that he intended to create "a movement to bring together people interested in poetry and music."

In the end, Florian was thrown out for performing songs punctuated with double entendres. Literary critic and folk music fan Dan C. Mihăilescu suggests that these disagreements reflected a larger cultural conflict. He describes Florian, Marcela Saftiuc, Sterian and Zaharia as fundamentally different from the "Maoist" agenda of Romanian communism, and notes that they also became irreconcilable with Păunescu when the latter committed himself to "embarrassing" indoctrination. Reflecting back on his childhood attendance of Cenaclul, writer-politician Varujan Vosganian noted a similar issue: "I liked Marcela Saftiuc, [...] Mircea Florian, Doru Stănculescu and many others, I did not like it when we were made to stand up clapping and chanting." As asserted by literary critic Ion Bogdan Lefter, "Few authentic artists of the [folk] genre could prevent its rapid absorption into the melodious, lyricaloid and often jingoistic kitsch promoted by the propagandistic Cenaclul Flacăra." Florian's account mentions the "controlled diversions" of such ventures, adding that the "real folk" of the 1970s was lost to indoctrination and commercialization.

Florian recalls that his lyrics, and especially his long-haired looks, were a growing cause for irritation among communist censors, and that as a consequence he devised various "strategies" for getting his message across to the public. He also explained: "In general the text that was very trenchant stood no chance—they would pick you up then and there and out you were [...]. But everybody would metaphorize. One would get what it was all about from the text, but the most important bit was the state of mind, the attitude sent out by the author, by the artist... [...] Very often [my] message was a simple one: I refused enrollment, I refused that social formula, I would not let myself be lied to and I would let the public know that, I called for 'general cleanup' actions, I also expressed my position on the fact that freedom had been taken away from me. That was fundamental."

Florian and Zaharia had a friendly relationship with writer Dorin Tudoran, who was in the process of becoming an outspoken dissident. According to Tudoran, it was around 1974 when the three of them first became aware that agents of the Securitate secret police were keeping them under surveillance. Ceata member Andrei Oişteanu, who made his career in religious studies, also noted that the Securitate was at the time closing in on himself and other non-conformists or hippies.

Florian's solo music was included on the 1973 split EP Muzică folk ("Folk Music"), which he shared with Saftiuc, then, in 1975, on the single Pădure liniştitoare/La făgădău' de piatră/Cu pleoapa de argint ("Quieting Forest/At the Stone Tavern/With the Silver Eyelid"). The songs, recorded with Chifiriuc, Reininger and Căciulă, were based on texts written by Florian or selected from Romanian folklore, particularly hajduk songs. The instrumental arrangement comprised a wide assortment of instruments: acoustic guitar, flute, drum kit, cobza, jaw harp, idiophones (all played by Florian himself), alongside electric guitar, tabla, conga, electric piano, celesta, synthesizer and electronic organ. Mihai Plămădeală describes the result as a unique project in Romanian music: "Nothing of what can be listened to or heard on it finds a direct correspondent in anything that anyone, anywhere, has achieved." He notes Florian's fusion of "hippie culture", "mantra" singing and the "maximal liberty of progressive rock". Reputedly, Florian remains the first Romanian singer to have employed the synthesizer in one of their works.

Florian continued with live performances, including the concert of Orăştioara de Sus, where he went on stage alongside Transsylvania Phoenix and the traditionalist drumming band of Brăneşti, performing what Florian calls "unfiltered, clean, unprocessed music." Like Nicu Vladimir, he gave concerts at the "fires on the beach" gatherings in the remote Black Sea resort of 2 Mai, a hippie hotspot, before such events were altogether banned on grounds of border security. He also provided the music to Andrei Oişteanu's play Vlacea, regele nebun ("Mad King Vlacea"), performed on tour by the Ţăndărică Theater, and reportedly poking fun at the authoritarian leader Nicolae Ceauşescu. Florian later made an appearance as actor-puppeteer and multi-instrumentalist performer in Till Eulenspiegel, directed by Cătălina Buzoianu for Ţăndărică. As he recalls, this involved him playing some 30 or 40 instruments in quick succession, from celesta, sackbut and melodica to guitar; Florian does not consider himself a consummate player of all such instruments: "it's like painting and needing some yellow just for a tiny highlight. You can't say you've painted in yellow."

Pădure... was followed in 1977 by another single, Fîntîna ("The Well"). An electronic rock product, it included a collaboration with rock drummer Radu Răducanu. In 1979, Florian was included on a compilation album, also titled Muzică folk. However, most of the music he composed and produced at that stage went unrecorded, or was only preserved on fidelipac. As noted by his former promoter Florin Silviu Ursulescu, who was working for the Radio Company, his supervisors had simply banned some of Florian's songs for containing what they called "inane lyrics".

=== Minimalism and new wave ===
Over the following period, Florian became more interested in electronic music, familiarizing himself with new technologies while working as an engineer for the Computer Science Institute, Bucharest. He also had access to the recordings kept in the Radu Stan collection at the State Central Library. According to his own reference system, this inaugurated a "green period". Beyond the early pop influences, Florian was increasingly inspired by the classics of electronic, aleatoric or minimal music: Léon Theremin, Pierre Schaeffer, Pierre Boulez, Karlheinz Stockhausen, Morton Subotnick, Lejaren Hiller, Steve Reich, Terry Riley, Iannis Xenakis, John Cage.

With collaborators Belu Alexandru and Valentin Antonescu, he tested minimalist recordings on magnetic tape, glued into various sequences. Florian also composed and, with the help of Transsylvania Phoenix drummer Costin Petrescu, recorded the experimental rock song Nicodim şi toaca ascunsă ("Nicodim and the Hidden Semantron"), which was visually supported by Florian's performance art and reworked on a music sequencer. The musical pieces were played at Florian's exhibits, including his contribution to the major multimedia show Scrierea ("Writing"), or in special "new music" concerts held in classical concert halls such as the Romanian Atheneum. His other activity as a multimedia artist was in biomusic: in 1976, Kalinderu Palace hosted his live study, Corpul uman ("The Human Body"), during which he mixed the body resonance of one friend into a musical arrangement.

In reference to this phase, Lefter includes Florian among the young men who reached out of the folk and hippie scenes and into the field of multimedia experiments, in what was largely an attempt to circumvent the official art of communism. This "pre-postmodern" transition, Lefter notes, was also affected by the Sfinx, Transsylvania Phoenix, "the weird" Dorin Zaharia and Nicu Vladimir, but Florian's work remained the "most interesting". Florian, who first began introducing himself as an "InterMedia artist" during the 1970s, collaborated with draftsman Anton Petraşincu, who created the first opaque projections to go with Florian's live singing.

By 1977, Florian's interest in electronic musical instruments, particularly synthesizers, created splits within Ceata Melopoică, which was also affected by some of its members' decisions to emigrate. In the early 1980s, Florian was again interested in setting up a classic rock band, but also sought to preserve the trademark combination of folklore and electronics. He switched to new wave music, with his new band Florian din Transilvania; among his new wave and electronic influences, Florian called to mind David Byrne, Brian Eno and Depeche Mode. Reflecting back on this time, he spoke of Sfinx's Dan Andrei Aldea as the "saint" of Romanian electronic music, one "more important than anyone else" on this scene.

The group only released one album, the 1986 vinyl-edition Tainicul vîrtej ("The Secret Swirl"), with the state-run recording company Electrecord. The lyricist and composer Florian did most of the vocals, and played cobza, guitar and synthesizer. The other members of the team came from various Romanian rock and pop acts: Andronescu was on keyboards, Doru Căplescu on additional synthesizer, Dan Cimpoieru on second guitar, Doru Istudor on drums, Zsolt Kerestely on electronic drums, with Mircea Baniciu providing backing vocals and Mihaela Hoaja the violin parts. Reportedly, the record went through the hands of official censors before being released, and Florian's song Madama Butterfly had to be discarded, leaving space for other songs such as Nunta lui Harap Alb ("Harap Alb's Wedding"). The song AS ("Ace"), also included on the album, was altogether banned after the Electrecord producers picked up on its political hints.

Plămădeală argues that Tainicul vîrtej follows its composer's "metaphysical" inclination, being notable for its "shock element", while journalist and musician Maria Balabaş describes the record as "psychedelic" with an "electronic sound". According to its author, it should also be seen as "intellectualized" and "elitist", but not in fact a "hiatus" in his artistic development. Florian additionally argued that, from "stupor", the public's reaction to his compositions became "very positive, even enthusiastic."

Although short-lived, the act became known on the underground scene for both its music and the conceptual art of its live performances, drawing comparisons with Tangerine Dream, Popol Vuh and the Third Ear Band; during such events, Florian would appear dressed up in a hazmat suit. Florian and his collaborators toured the country, and were awarded the first prize at the Constelaţii rock event in Râmnicu Vâlcea. Tainicul vîrtej also led to shows at various underground venues, from Stelian Tănase's rock evenings at the Revue Theater to the State Jewish Theater stage and Arenele Romane.

The artist was several times invited to exhibit his work outside Romania, and even beyond the Iron Curtain, receiving a scholarship from the German Academic Exchange Service and attending the Darmstädter Ferienkurse, where he worked under Stockhausen's supervision. In 1982, he was among those collaborating with the Nordwestdeutscher Rundfunk studio of electronic music, in Cologne. His concerts abroad were probably the reason why his Tainicul vîrtej was never on general release: the communist government allegedly presumed that he would not be returning, and tried to prevent the public from glorifying his departure. Florian accuses Electrecord of having mismanaged the distribution, by not printing sufficient copies and by oversupplying shops located outside Bucharest.

=== Defection and return ===
Mircea Florian continued his work in other media, joining with the SubReal performance artists, with whom he staged a 1986 event in the city of Sibiu. He notes having been increasingly frustrated by censorship, which prevented him from participating in some exhibits and concerts, and eventually pondering about leaving the country.

After receiving a visa for the United States, where he had been invited to present his sound installations, he defected and later settled down in West Germany. He changed residence between the cities of North Rhine-Westphalia: Mettmann, Wuppertal, Düsseldorf. He decided not to work as a musician, because he could only conceive of singing in his native Romanian language.

Florian focused on his work as an artist and computer scientist. Since the late 1980s he has been combining visual arts with music to create sound sculptures, sound installations, and collages. By 2009, his work had received some 21 awards, including, alongside Romanian ones, German, British and Japanese distinctions. He was present with his work at the Venice Biennale of 1999, and managed a Romanian festival in Wuppertal.

In the decades after the Romanian Revolution of 1989, Florian has resumed his collaboration with Romanian artists, including Nicu Covaci: in 1992, he wrote the title song on Covaci's "Symphoenix" album Timișoara. Also in 1992, he participated in setting up Deutsch-Rumänische Kulturbegegnungen ("German-Romanian Cultural Encounters", or DeR KuB), a cultural society dedicated to cooperation between artists; its Romanian branch is the Mircea Florian Association. Two years later, some of his work was reissued on the Club A compilation. Florian also contributed the preface to Vlad Arghir's book, the first Romanian-language monograph on Leonard Cohen, published in Hungary by Pont Kiadó.

Florian and DeR KuB have organized several events reuniting Romanian folkloric ensembles from Hungary, Serbia and Ukraine with bands representing the various traditions of minority groups in Romania. He personally spent a week in Satu Mare Prison, coaching the detainees' own musical project, and created portrait projection shows in Satu Mare and Bratislava. In addition to opening for Phoenix and Covaci at reunion concerts in 2003, Florian has performed with the Shukar Collective project, which mixes electronic music with Romani tradition. He and Shukar's DJ Vasile remixed several Ursari renditions of old songs, "some five out of eleven" entries on the Collective's album, and including the single Anna e Manole. He intended to continue work with this group, but it disbanded following lead singer Tamango's illness.

Florian's performance art was showcased in exhibits at the National Theatre Bucharest, the International Center for Contemporary Art, the Cluj-Napoca Technical College etc. In addition, he was visiting scholar at the Caragiale Academy of Theatrical Arts and Cinematography and Babeş-Bolyai University. Florian was also invited to sing at the Stufstock event of Vama Veche, in 2004, but refused to perform on stage, and gave an impromptu concert on one of the side alleys, in hopes of addressing only his real fans. Florian was later a guest at Festivalul Plai, a multicultural music event held in Timișoara city. He also returned to attend the Gărâna Jazz Festival, and tried to set up his own world music festival project, in Certeze. His presences at Folk You! in Vama Veche were included on the festival's "best of" compilation for 2007. In January 2008, after polling the Romanian music critics, Sunete magazine ranked Florian the 11th most important musician in the country's pop history.

=== Later projects ===
Florian composed the musical score to Ioan Cărmăzan's drama film Margo (2006). Like the film itself, his contribution received strong criticism from film critic Andrei Gorzo: "Margo travels a lot by train, then walks even more, [...] forever accompanied by the chirps, electronic farts and Spaghetti Western ding-dongs in Mircea Florian's music." Florian was later the composer of music for Alexandru Solomon's political documentary Kapitalism: Our Improved Formula (2010). It was received with interest by film journalist Mihai Fulger, who described Solomon as a "trendsetter", for attaching Florian's original music to animation and archive footage. Florian's contribution was nominated for the Gopo Awards of 2011, in the "Best Original Music in Short Film" category.

He was additionally working with Cătălina Buzoianu, arranging the music to her various productions, including a 2005 version of August Strindberg's Father and a 2008 staging of Mircea Cărtărescu's Dream. Theater manager and poet Ion Cocora was impressed by the latter show and its "fairy tale state", describing Florian's music as "a continuous oscillation between the real and the unreal." Theater critic Alice Georgescu also described Florian's music for Dream as "felicitously reusing childish rhymes". The collaborative project was later taken up for the 2009 productions of Matei Vişniec's Joan and the Fire and We're Banning Richard III (Bulandra Theater), as well as to the 2010 adaptation of Isaac Bashevis Singer's The Magician of Lublin (State Jewish Theater).

Around 2007, Florian's work in art again centered on magnetic tape, used in collages and sound sculptures. One example is his work The Last Supper, exhibited in Berlin: it is a combination of three analog recordings, on different colors of tape, played in unison. His work in Romania covered graphic art, and he designed the layout to the cultural review aLtitudini. Some of his other projects again bridged avant-garde jazz and literature. Around 2004, he toured with novelist Gheorghe Crăciun, who was promoting his book Pupa Russa. In 2010, he resumed his work with Valery Oisteanu, upon the latter's return from the United States. Their mix of Surrealism and electronic music was hosted by the Green Hours pub, in Bucharest.

While experimenting with a new generation of electronica gear (samplers, Ableton Live and Max programs, Korg adapters etc.), Florian still saw string instruments as his first love, and noted that he had also begun playing the guitalele. In February 2011, Florian, DJ Vasile and their new music project, FloriMan, performed live at the Cinema Total, part of the Berlinale festivities. During this, they mixed electronic music and traditional bucium-playing. His past work was also included in the Berlin exhibit When History Comes Knocking: Romanian Art from the 80s and 90s in Close Up.

In June, the Vasile Goldiş West University made Florian an honoris causa doctor. The same year, he returned to Romania with a re-release of Tainicul vîrtej as a Bucharest musical show, part of the Club A Festival, and a personal exhibit at the Bucharest Municipal Art Galleries, Negrele-mi aripi ("Black My Wings"), turned into a film directed by fellow artist Victor Velculescu. It recorded Florian's installations, which comprised brushes, a laptop, an oscilloscope and other instruments, creating the illusion of a winged figure attached to his body. Also in 2011, the alternative rock act byron covered one of his Tainicul vîrtej songs on their own album Perfect.
