= Peter Wertheimer =

Romanian-Israeli musician (1947–2020)

Peter Wertheimer פיטר ורטהיימר
- Born: 21 July 1947; Satu Mare, Romania
- Died: 5 January 2020 (aged 72) Tel Aviv, Israel
- Genres: Jazz
- Occupation: Musician
- Instruments: Flute; saxophone; clarinet
- Years active: 1973–2020
- Spouse: Adi Lev (m. 1981; died 2006)

Peter Wertheimer (Hebrew: פיטר ורטהיימר; 21 July 1947 – 5 January 2020) was a Romanian-Israeli jazz musician who specialised in playing the flute, saxophone and the clarinet.

== Biography ==
=== In Romania ===
Wertheimer was born in Satu Mare to violinist Andrei Wertheimer. He spent most of his childhood in Timișoara, where his father pioneered in jazz music within the area and was also an opera concertmaster. Wertheimer learned to play the classical violin at the age of five and began his studies at the local music school, which he was later expelled from when his family’s request to emigrate to Israel was denied. He later moved to Bucharest to continue pursuing his music studies and attend the National University of Music Bucharest.

Wertheimer often performed in nightclubs, cafes, culture centres and he was eventually hired by an orchestra, which he later toured abroad with in Switzerland and Germany and performed in numerous jazz festivals. Wertheimer also made collaborations with Johnny Răducanu, Eugen Gondi, Marius Popp, Radu Goldiș and Adrian Enescu.

=== In Israel ===
In 1977, Wertheimer moved to Israel. He originally lived in a small village on the outskirts of Rehovot before moving to Tel Aviv. There, he began working in the Israeli music industry with assistance from Nancy Brandes. He would also occasionally provide background music for prominent artists such as Ilanit, Izhar Cohen, Arik Lavie, Ron Shoval, Arik Einstein, Gali Atari and Margalit Tzan'ani. Wertheimer soon began exploring different music styles and also performed adaptions of Johann Sebastian Bach’s music.

Wertheimer performed as a soloist for the Israel Philharmonic Orchestra and he also worked with the Gevatron. He also made some light appearances in several Israeli films and he also made an appearance on the children’s show Parpar Nechmad.

=== Personal life and death ===
Wertheimer was married to actress Adi Lev from 1981 until Lev’s death from cancer in 2006. They had two children, Alon and Shirley. The latter of which is an actress. Wertheimer divided his career between Israel and his native Romania.

Wertheimer died of cancer on 5 January 2020, at the age of 72.
