= Oisteanu =

Oisteanu or Oişteanu is a surname. Notable people with the surname include:

- Andrei Oişteanu (born 1948), Romanian historian of religions and mentalities, ethnologist, cultural anthropologist, literary critic and novelist
- Valery Oisteanu (born 1943), Soviet-born Romanian and American poet, art critic, essayist, photographer and performance artist
