= Costin Petrescu (musician) =

Romanian musician

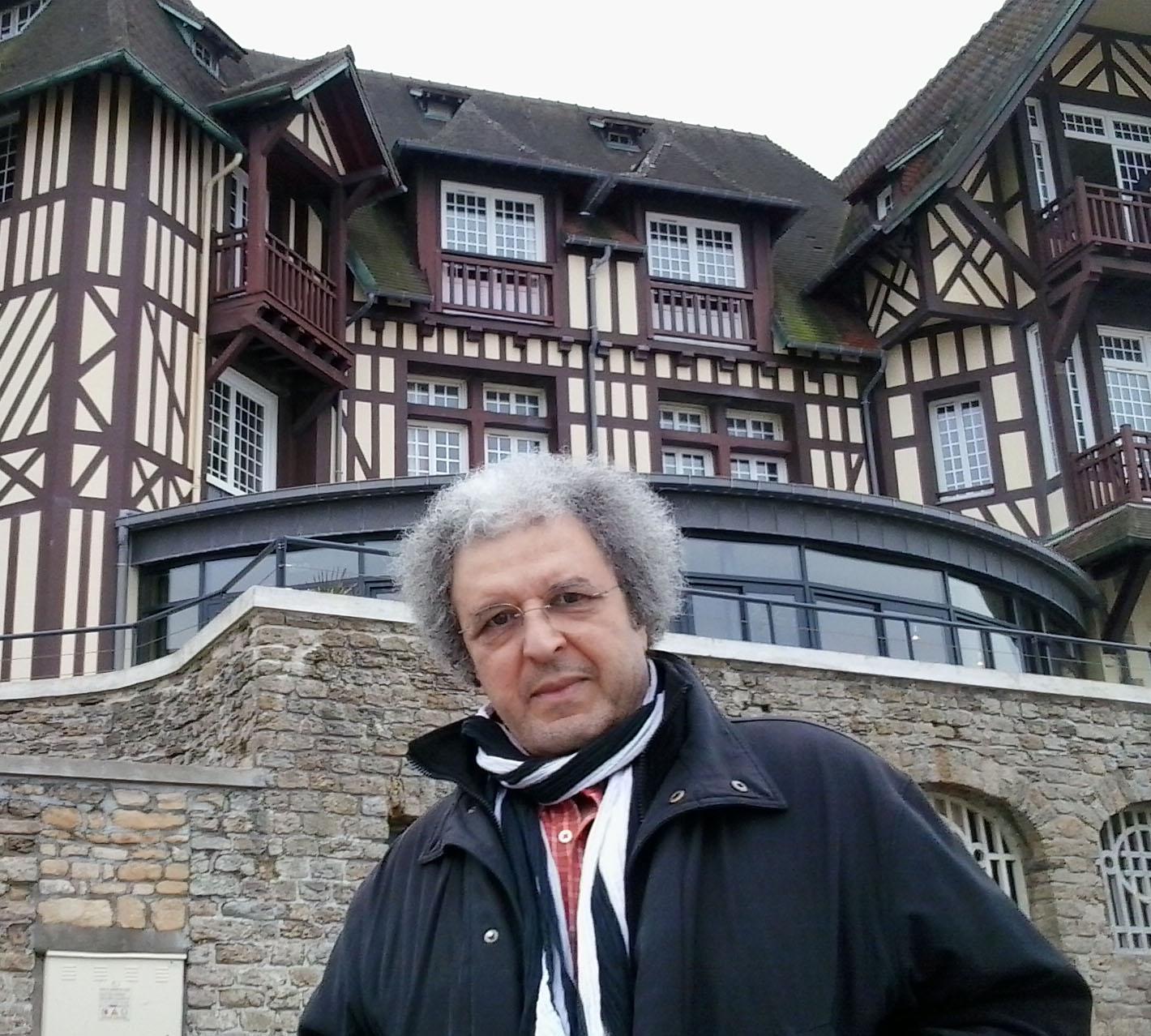
Costin Petrescu in Dauville, France

Costin Petrescu (born in 1947 in Bucharest) is an architect, graphic artist, percussionist and Romanian-French composer.

He is one of the pioneers of the Romanian rock performing in two pop-rock bands, Olympic 64 and Phoenix. His love for jazz and jazz / rock led to numerous projects and collaborations with Mircea Tiberian, Marius Popp, Dan Mandrila, Johnny Răducanu, Cătălin Târcolea, Dragoş Nedelcu, Mircea Florian, Nicu Alifantis, Sergiu Cioiu. He has a prestigious activity in avant-garde contemporary music, performing alongside Iancu Dumitrescu / Hyperion Ensemble and participating in the works of other composers such as Vlad Ulpiu, Mihaela Vozganian, Horia Surianu, as well as his personal projects.

In parallel, he has worked in the field of architecture for a long time with a successful career in Bucharest, Paris, and Beirut. During all this time he never abandoned his early love for graphics and drawing.

He is one of the grandchildren of the painter Costin Petrescu.

== Biography ==
=== Music and preparation for architecture ===
From a very young age, Costin Petrescu showed interest in artistic areas. He took piano lessons early in his life but the family instrument was sold in order to cover the high cost of living created by the crisis of the '50s after the second world war and the establishment of communism in Romania. However Costin, encouraged by his nanny, immediately substitute the loss of the piano with playing wooden spoons and the various family gastronomic vessels.

By the time he turned five, Costin caught the attention of the drummer and musician Sergiu Malagamba, a friend of the family, who encouraged his musical interests. His mother, member of a well known choir in Bucharest, never stopped to inspire and encouraged him. His music teacher from high school also recognised the talent and supported the purchase of a real set of drums. Soon after, Costin joined the 60s rock group The Pioneers.

In 1964, the year of the Tokyo Olympics, The Pioneers became Olympic'64 and the new band quickly established itself with the music fans due to numerous engagements in clubs, concert halls and the Romanian Television. By now Costin greatly developed his drumming capabilities and together with the guitarist Picky Inglessis and his childhood friend Dorin Liviu Zaharia, nicknamed Chubby due to his style that resembled Chubby Checker, they started to write original music. The two rock operas that came out of this collaboration, the Dodecameron of the White Fire and Karma Kaliyuga made history at the Pop-Rock Music Festival organised by the Faculty of Architecture in Bucharest. The communist officials were not impressed with that kind of theatrics and the festival was banned for many years.

Meanwhile, Costin attended the Faculty of Architecture Ion Mincu. As he entered the 4th year of studies the band called it quits, but Costin immediately joined another established rock group, Phoenix from Timișoara.

With Phoenix, Costin climbed up the pop-rock ladder. The hard work was rewarded by sold-out concerts in Romania and abroad. Three vinyl records, of which two LPs and one Single were produced during this period and the band was invited at music festivals in Bratislava (Czech Republic) and Sopot (Poland). The band is now notorious in Romania but Costin wants something else and he begins a love affair with jazz and other musical forms, listening to Weather Report, Blood Sweet and Tears, Frank Zappa, Miles Davis, John Coltrane or Sun Ra.

At the Bucharest university, Costin had the chance to study the great Le Corbusier, to which he attached himself as a "fan" and a disciple. He travels frequently to Timișoara but the distance between the two cities is somewhat diminished by the tenacity with which he balances the two primordial arts needed in order to express himself.

Phoenix is working now on their fourth album, a double one titled Cantafabule, but due to incompatibilities with the leader of the group, Nicolae Covaci, Costin leaves the band during the recordings. This time he moves towards jazz, jazz-rock and ethno-jazz music, performing concerts and recording with top personalities from this area of music: Mircea Tiberian, Marius Popp and Dragoş Nedelcu, pianists, Dan Mandrila saxophonist, Johnny Răducanu double bass, Cătălin Tarcolea flute. He also participates to the recordings and concerts of Mircea Florian, Nicu Alifantis, folk-singers and composers, and the singer and actor Sergiu Cioiu, integrating his participation in various and diverse musical fields.

After obtaining the degree in architecture in 1974, Costin follows for six months the Artillery Reserve Officers' School in Braila and then works at Buftea Cinemas Studios as a stage designer. At the end of 1977 he is employed as an architect at a design institute in Bucharest where he remains for many years working on industrial and housing projects.

During this period Costin is co-opted as a percussionist by the composer Iancu Dumitrescu, the founder of the contemporary music group Hyperion. Their repertoire consisted of old Romanian music picked and transposed by Anton Pann, Domitian Vlah, Dimitrie Cantemir, Ioan Căianu, Ieromonahul Vlahu, Filotei but also of the music of some Romanian modern composers considered interesting in Europe at that time, including Iancu Dumitrescu, Aurel Stroe, Stefan Niculescu, Corneliu Cezar, Octavian Nemescu, Costin Cazaban, Horia Surianu etc.

Costin continues to expand his musical taste by listening continuously to Messiaen, Schöenberg, Stockhausen, Alban Berg, Steve Reich, John Cage, Xenakis (an architect of Romanian-Greek origin), Pierre Schaeffer and others. From this moment, Costin enters the world of the so-called "avant-garde music", falls in love with the new and vast universal sound and begins to build his own arsenal of percussion instruments needed to reproduce the vibrations inside his head.

Hyperion is touring extensively not only in Romania but in other parts of Europe as well: Italy, Austria, Germany, France, Portugal.

=== Departure from Romania and the pure architecture ===
At the end of another tour with Hyperion, Costin decides not to return to the homeland. To escape the serious deterioration of the social, economic and political situation in Romania, Costin, with the help of a good, old friend, Mihai Munteanu, an architect himself, settles in Paris. His wife and daughter join him in about two years, but not without difficulty.

In Paris the attempts to resume the musical activity failed and at the advice of the great musician Michel Berger and his wife France Gall, whom he had already met, Costin returns to architecture where he resumed his work.

In only three years, he became project manager at a French architectural agency, the "Jean Jaques Ory" cabinet. There are many interesting large and medium-sized works in Paris and the surrounding areas, culminating with "Washington Plaza" a huge restructuring project of the business centre.

The so-called "Romanian Revolution" of December 1989, finds Costin in Paris with his architect colleagues. He organised immediately with a few friends from the diaspora an association called CRED (Consensus pour la Roumanie Européene et Démocratique) with the idea to help Romania at that precise moment. In addition, he managed to reform Phoenix for a one-off concert in the free world at "La Cigale" in Paris,

For several years, Costin worked at two other important Parisian architectural agencies after which he created his own firm, La Strada.

Soon he had the opportunity to work for two years in Beirut, Lebanon, leading a design team to build the student dormitories in the new Hadath University Campus.

=== Business ===
In 1997, Costin opened in Bucharest "Magic Sign", a company that imported from France construction and architecture technology. It was a success and there were serious years of work and development. Unfortunately the post-communist era and the Romanian overall system created a lot of problems. During this period he collaborated sporadically with old musicians friends, mainly Mircea Florian and Mircea Baniciu. In 2015 Costin abandoned the business altogether to devote himself completely to his love of music and design. He draws in pen and pencil graphics, visits the most interesting and sophisticated exhibitions in Paris, travels often to Bucharest and spends hours composing, assisted by the computer and using electronic percussion instruments as well as real and virtual tools. In 2018 he wrote the book Between Phoenix and ... Le Corbusier, a dialogue with the prominent Romanian rock historian Nelu Stratone.

== Discography ==
- Olympic '64 – Cântic de haiduc/Ziua bradului de noapte (single, 1970) — drums
- Phoenix – Cei ce ne-au dat nume (LP, album, 1972) — drums, percussion
- Phoenix – Meșterul Manole (EP, 1973) — drums, percussion
- Phoenix – Mugur de fluier (LP, album, 1974) — drums, percussion
- Phoenix – song „Omule, cine ești tu?” – Formații de muzică pop 1 (LP, compilation, 1975) — drums
- Phoenix – Formația „Phoenix” (MC, compilation, 1975) — drums, percussion
- Erika Józsa & Horváth Károly – Kettőspont (Două puncte) (LP, album, 1978) — percussion
- Nicu Alifantis – După melci (LP, album, 1979) — drums, percussion
- Mircea Baniciu – Dor de drum/Colind (single, 1981) — percussion
- Sergiu Cioiu, Dan Stoian, Marin Sorescu – La o adică (LP, album, 1981) — drums, percussion
- Dan Mândrilă – Alter ego (LP, album, 1981) — percussion
- Ansamblul Hyperion – Ansamblul Hyperion (LP, album, 1981) — percussion
- Cătălin Tîrcolea – Zboruri (LP, album, 1982) — drums, percussion
- Ulpiu Vlad – Mozaic (LP, album, 1982) — percussion
- Fernando Grillo, Iancu Dumitrescu, Octavian Nemescu, Costin Cazaban, Horia Surianu – Romanian Contemporary Music (2xLP, album, 1982) — percussion
- Marius Popp – Nodul gordian (LP, album, 1984) — percussion
- Iancu Dumitrescu – Medium II/Cogito (LP, album, 1987) — percussion
- Phoenix – Remember Phoenix (LP, compilation, 1991) — drums, percussion
- Marius Popp – Jazz Restitutio 3 (LP, album, 1993) — drums
- Phoenix – Evergreens (CD, compilation, 1995) — drums, percussion
- Phoenix – Aniversare 35 (CD, album, 1997) — percussion
- Ana-Maria Avram & Iancu Dumitrescu – Orbit of Eternal Grace (CD, album, 1999) — percussion
- Dan Mândrilă – Jazz Restitutio (CD, compilation, 2003) — percussion
- Ana-Maria Avram & Iancu Dumitrescu – Laboratory (CD, album, 2006) — percussion

== Other activities ==
- Graphics, pencil and pen drawing
- Writing
- Interior design

== Bibliography ==
- Petrescu, Costin. Între Phoenix și... Le Corbusier. Costin Petrescu în dialog cu Nelu Stratone, Editura Casa de pariuri literare, București, 2018. ISBN 978-606-990-066-6
