= Costin Petrescu =

Costin Petrescu may refer to:

- Costin Petrescu (musician) (born 1949), Romanian rock musician
- Costin Petrescu (painter) (1872–1954), Romanian painter
