= Goldiș =

Goldiş is a Romanian surname. Notable people with the surname include:

- Radu Goldiş (born 1947), Romanian-American jazz guitarist
- Vasile Goldiș (1862–1934), Romanian politician and member of the Romanian Academy

== See also ==
- Vasile Goldiş, a village in Beliu Commune, Arad County, Romania.
