= Limanu =

- Commune
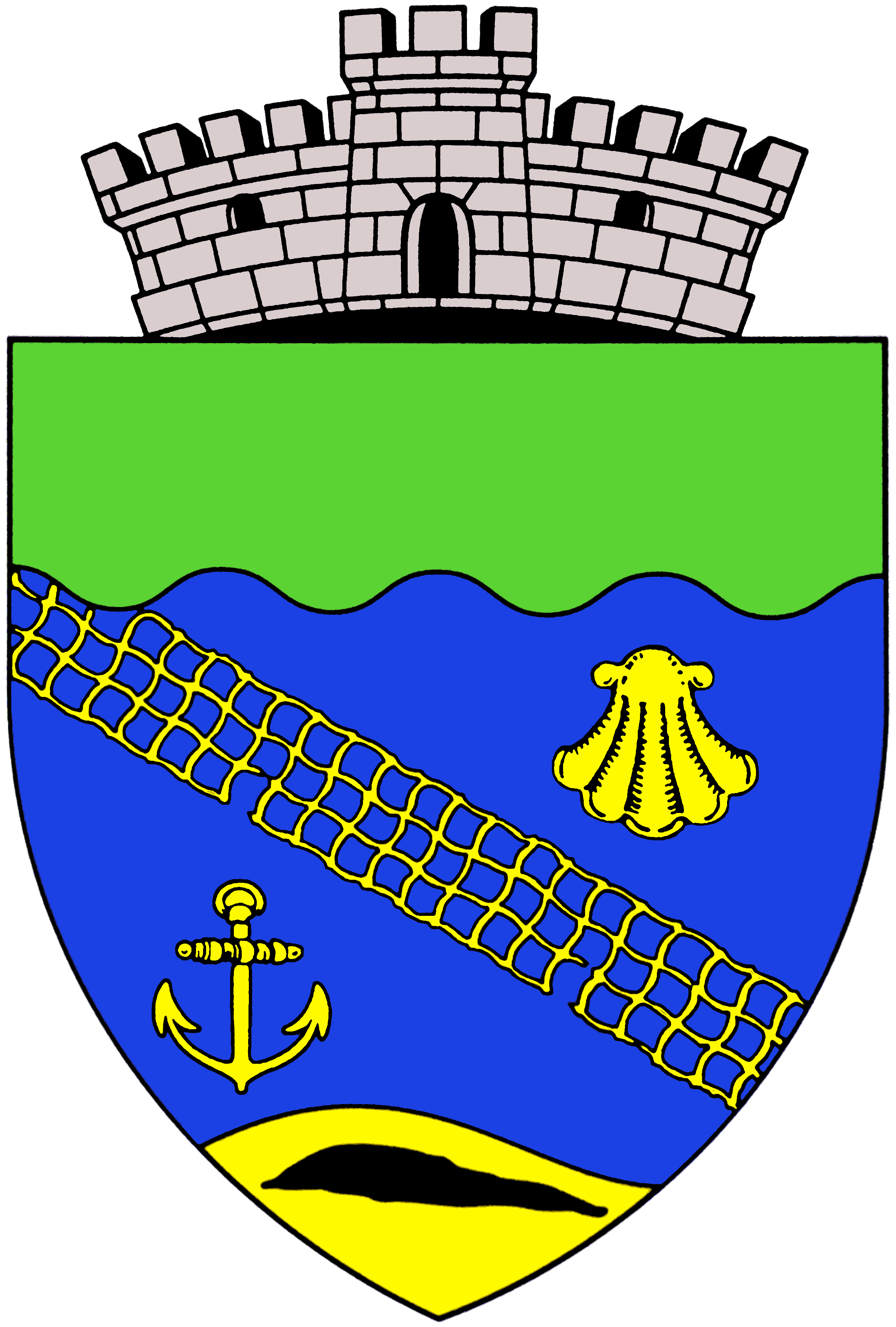
- Coat of arms

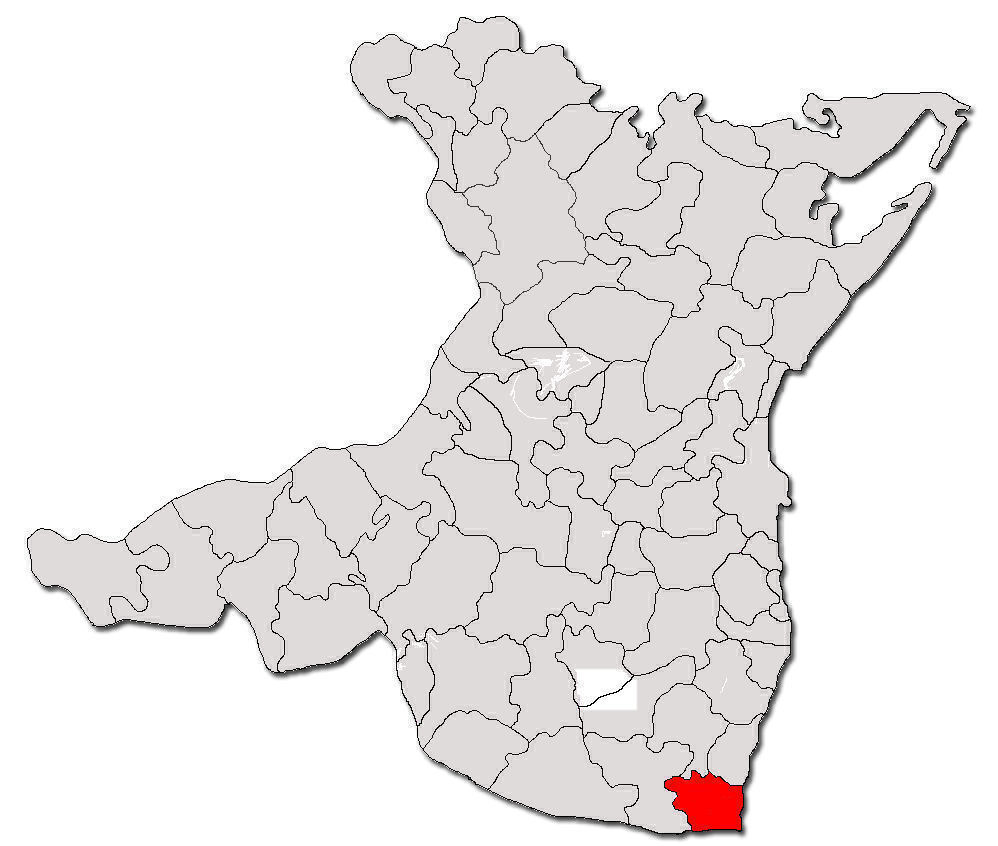
- Location in Constanța County

- Location in Romania
- Coordinates: 43°48′N 28°32′E
- Country: Romania
- County: Constanța
- Subdivisions: Limanu, 2 Mai, Hagieni, Vama Veche

Government
  - Mayor (2020–2024): Daniel Georgescu (PSD)
- Area: 76.66 km^{2} (29.60 sq mi)
- Population (2021-12-01): 6,350
  - Density: 82.8/km^{2} (215/sq mi)
- Time zone: UTC+02:00 (EET)
  - Summer (DST): UTC+03:00 (EEST)
- Vehicle reg.: CT
- Website: www.primarialimanu.ro

Limanu (Romanian pronunciation: [liˈmanu]) is a commune in Constanța County, Northern Dobruja, Romania.

== Demographics ==
At the 2011 census, Limanu had 5,337 Romanians (85.1%), 8 Hungarians (0.1%), 84 Roma (1.3%), 3 Germans (0.05%), 6 Turks (0.10%), 179 Tatars (2.9%), 178 Lipovans (2.8%), 4 others (0.07%), 465 with undeclared ethnicity (7.4%).

== Villages ==
The commune includes four villages:

- Limanu (historical names: Caracicula, Greek: Limani (Port), Turkish: Karaçuklu)
- 2 Mai
- Hagieni (historical names: Hagilar, Turkish: Hacılar)
- Vama Veche (historical names: Ilanlâc, Turkish: İlanlık)

=== 2 Mai ===
2 Mai (Romanian pronunciation: [doj maj], "May 2") is a village in the Limanu commune and a small resort on the shore of the Black Sea, between Mangalia and Vama Veche.

The village was founded by Mihail Kogălniceanu in 1887 under the name Două Mai. Its first inhabitants were Russians from Bucharest, Iași and Galați. Later Lipovans from Tulcea County and Romanians from Argeș County settled here.

The main occupation of the villagers is the agritourism, fishing, tourism and agriculture.

=== Vama Veche ===
Vama Veche is a village in the Limanu commune, at 43°45′N 28°34′E. In 2002, it had a population of 178.

It was founded in 1811 by a few Gagauz families, originally being named "Ilanlîk". Its current name literally means "Old customs point", named so after the Southern Dobruja (or Cadrilater) had been included in Romania in 1913. In 1940, however, that region was ceded to Bulgaria, and the village has since lain once again near the border.

== Titans Cave ==
After finishing this campaign Crassus led his troops against the cave called Ciris(Keiris/Ceiris). For the natives in great numbers had occupied this cave, which is extremely large and so capable of defence that the tradition obtains that the Titans took refuge there after their defeat suffered at the hands of the gods; and here they had brought together all their herds and their other most cherished belongings. 4 Crassus first sought out all the entrances to the cave, which are tortuous and difficult to discover, walled them up, and in this way subdued the men by famine.

-Dio Cassius LI

Some historians identified the Titan cave as Limanu cave.

== Natives ==
- Gheorghe Dumitru

== Twin towns - Sister cities ==
- Santa Marinella, Italy
