= Shukar Collective =

Romanian musical group

Shukar Collective (from the Romani word Shukar or Șucar, meaning "beautiful") is a Romanian musical group which fuses traditional Romani and electronic music. It is especially known for using traditional rhythms employed by the Ursari section of the Roma minority with contemporary electronic sampling. They generally mix various sounds produced by tapping spoons or other domestic objects with those produced on analog synthesizers.

The concept that led to the success of the group belongs to Paul Țanicui, Romanian film director who discovered the Ursari musicians Tamango, Napoleon and Classic that he would later name “Shukar”. Short time after, Romanian musicians Dj Vasile, Dan Handrabur (a.k.a. Dreamdoktor), Cristi Stanciu (a.k.a. Matze) and Vlaicu Golcea came with the compositions of the first Shukar Collective album, "Taves Bahtalo!"/ "Urban Gypsy".

Recently, they have been collaborating with Romanian multimedia artist Mircea Florian.

In 2010, the group was the subject of an HBO documentary.

Shukar Collective participated at Brighton Fringe Festival on 2 May 2010, a day after their concert in the Brixton neighborhood, London, where the electro-pop clubs are always full. This mini-tour was done with the help and support of The Romanian Cultural Institute, from London.

== Discography ==
=== Released Albums ===
- 2005 Urban Gypsy

Song list:
01-Calling Tamango
02-The Wind
03-Malademna
04-Gipsy Blooz
05-Taraf
06-Oh, Mother
07-Bar Boot
08-Shub
09-Mamo
10-Hahaha
11-Desperiae Romanes
12-Do Baba
13-Lautarium
14-Verbal Fight
15-Wander (Bonus track)

- 2007 Rromatek

Song list:
01-Oh, Girl
02-Dalladida
03-Ragga Mamï
04-New Shout
05-Hi Ley
06-The Snake
07-Truppa Truppa
08-Mean Macheen
09-Pray
10-Shukar Muzika
11-Napolament
12-Pam Paraï
13-Gossip
14-Time Peace
15-Daï Daï
