= 2 Mai =

- Village
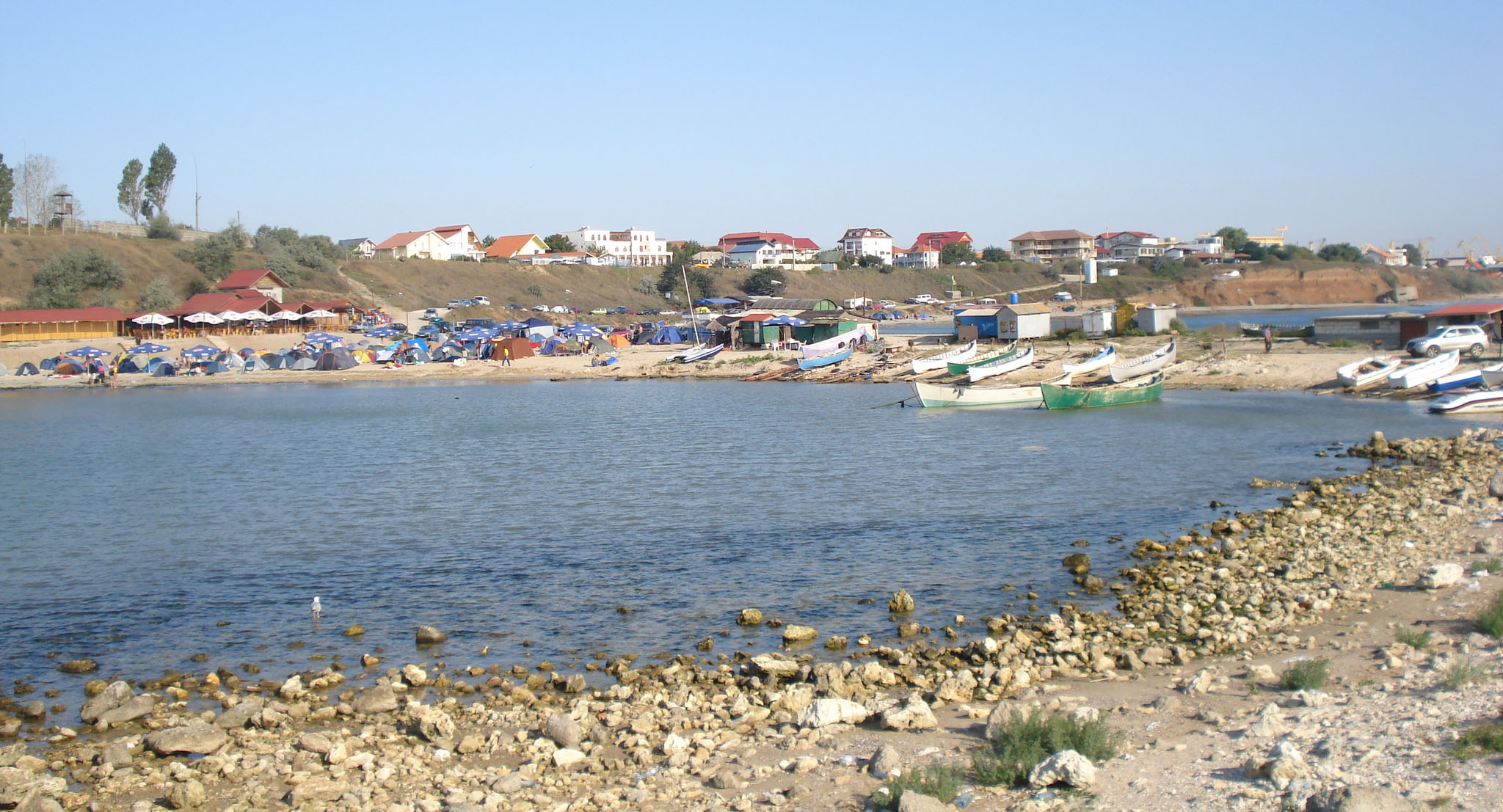
- The beach at 2 Mai
- Etymology: Romanian coup d'état of 2 May 1864
- Location in Romania
- Coordinates: 43°47′N 28°35′E
- Country: Romania
- County: Constanța
- Commune: Limanu

Population (2011)
  - Total: 2,848

2 Mai (Romanian pronunciation: [doj maj], "2 May") (according to the Socialist Republic of Romania records) or Două Mai (according to the founding decree signed by Mihail Kogălniceanu in 1887) is a village in the Limanu commune, Constanța County, Dobrogea, Romania. It is found on the shoreline at a distance of 6 km (3.7 mi) north of Vama Veche and 5 km (3.1 mi) south of Mangalia. Doi Mai is also a summer vacation destination.

Its name (then Două Mai ) was chosen to celebrate 2 May 1864, when Domnitor Alexandru Ioan Cuza dissolved the Legislative Assembly (Adunarea Legislativă) of the United Principalities of Moldavia and Wallachia to promote his reforms. Nine years before the founding of the village, Northern Dobruja was given to Romania through the treaty of Berlin after it had been taken from the Ottoman Empire at the end of the Russo-Turkish War of 1877–1878.

Russian voluntary eunuchs of the Old Believers sect, being persecuted in their homeland of the Russian Empire, found refuge here in the 19th century, amongst the Greek fishermen, Romanian shepherds and Tatar horse breeders, who had huts and rudimentary houses in the area.
