= Olympic '64 =

- Genres: rock, Beat, psychedelic rock, ethno rock, pop rock, folk rock, psychedelic folk
- Years active: 1964–1971
- Labels: Electrecord
- Past members: Dorin Liviu Zaharia; Dimitrie William Piki Inglessis; Lukis Viratsonis; Mihai Teodorescu; Antheos; Titel Tățulescu; Alexandru Preda; Costin Petrescu; Mircea Marian; Dan Dimitriu; Cornel Guriţă; Nicolae Oprescu

Olympic '64 was a music group from Romania that were active in the 1960s and early 1970s.

Olympic '64 had its roots in a band called Pioneers, which was founded in 1961 by pupils from the „Mihai Viteazul” High School in Bucharest. Among the members were: Dimitrie William Piki Inglessis (guitar), Lukis Viratsonis (guitar), Mihai Teodorescu (piano), Antheos (double bass), and Titel Tățulescu (drums).

In the first years, Cornel Guriță also collaborated as a vocalist and guitarist, but later Dorin Liviu Zaharia became their main vocalist.

Before they appeared on TV for the first time, on October 9, 1964, producer Valeriu Lazarov suggested that they change their name into Olympic '64, as it was around the time of the opening of the Tokyo Summer Olympics.

In the summers they used to play for three months at the Perla restaurant in Mamaia, while in the winters they used to play at the Mon Jardin restaurant in București. After a while Costin Petrescu replaced Titel Tățulescu on drums, and Dinu Rădescu replaced Antheos on bass.

In 1969, at the first edition of the Club A Festival, they performed the rock opera Decameronul focului alb, for which they won an award.

In 1971, at the second edition of the Club A Festival, they performed the rock opera Karma Kaliyuga, with lyrics by Dante Alighieri, Rabindranath Tagore, Sergei Yesenin, Mihai Eminescu, Erik Axel Karlfeldt, Ion Mircea and Dorin Liviu Zaharia.

== Awards ==
- Best Award for performance concept and Romanian style (for the rock opera Decameronul focului alb), CLUB A Festival, 1969

== Discography ==
- Cântic de haiduc/Ziua bradului de noapte (single), Electrecord

== See also ==
- Dorin Liviu Zaharia
