= Adi Lev =

Israeli actress (1953–2006)

- עדי לב
- Born: 20 August 1953; Farcașa, Romania
- Died: 12 March 2006 (aged 52); Jaffa, Israel
- Occupations: Actress; voice actress
- Years active: 1989–2006
- Spouse: Peter Wertheimer (m. 1981)
- Children: 2

Adi Lev (Hebrew: עדי לב; 20 August 1953 – 12 March 2006) was an Israeli actress and voice actress.

== Biography ==
Born in Romania, Lev emigrated to Israel with her family at 16 years of age. She studied acting at Tel Aviv University and Beit Zvi. She also went to an acting workshop in New York City in the 1970s. Upon her return to Israel, Lev began performing at the Habima Theatre and the Cameri Theatre where she starred in a theatre adaptation of Les Misérables. She also made a collaboration with director Sofia Moskowitz. On screen, Lev was known for working with Ze'ev Revach in many of his films and appearing in Broken Wings and The Rubber Merchants.

Since the late 1990s, Lev focused her attention to dubbing. She performed the Hebrew voices of Baba Yaga in Bartok the Magnificent, Roz in Monsters, Inc., Mrs. Hasagawa in Lilo & Stitch, Mrs. Tweedy in Chicken Run and Kala in Tarzan II.

=== Personal life ===
In 1981, Lev married Romanian musician Peter Wertheimer. They had two children, Alon and Shirley, who is also an actress.

== Death ==
Lev died of cancer on 12 March 2006, at the age of 52 after being diagnosed the previous September. She was buried at the Old Cemetery of Herzliya.
