= GL-1 Guitalele =

Yamaha GL-1 Guitalele
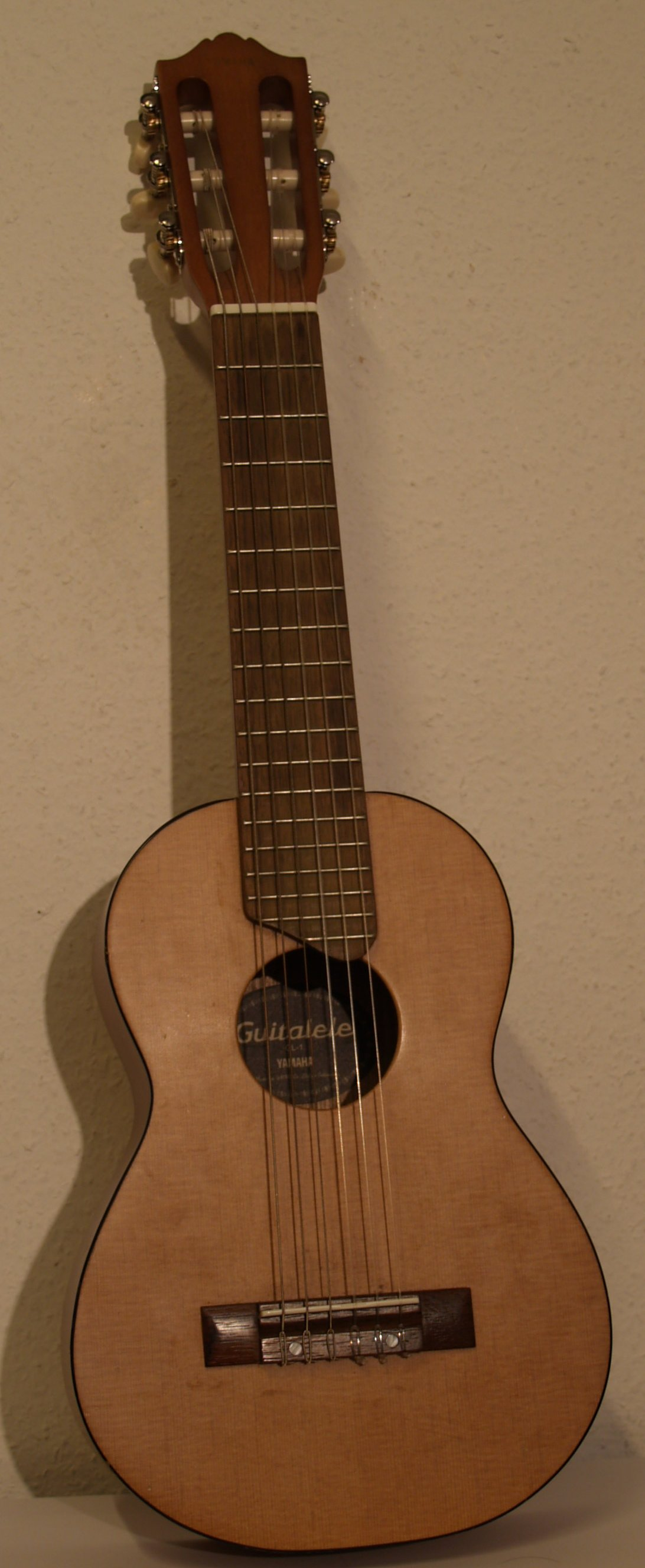
- Classification: String instrument

Related instruments
- guitalele, classical guitar and tenor ukulele

The Yamaha GL-1 is a guitalele, also known as a 1/4 size guitar or guitar-ukulele hybrid, combining the size of an ukulele with the wider fretboard and six single nylon strings of a classical guitar.

The guitalele combines the portability of an ukulele, due to its small size, with greater chord possibilities from six strings. In January 1997, Yamaha Corporation came out with its version, the GL-1 Guitalele.

Its dimensions are: scale length (nut to saddle) 432 mm (17"); nut width 47.6 mm (1 7/8"); body length 698 mm (27 1/2"); body width 229 mm (9"); body depth 71.4 mm (2 13/16").

The GL-1 guitalele has an unadorned laminated spruce top (with no rosette), laminated meranti back and sides, nato neck and rosewood fretboard. It comes tuned ADGCEA, and is played like a guitar pitched up to “A” (like a guitar with a capo on the fifth fret).
