= Horia Moculescu =

Romanian pianist and composer (1937–2025)

Horia Moculescu (18 March 1937 – 12 November 2025) was a Romanian pianist, composer and record producer.

== Biography ==
After finishing high school in Turda, he studied at the Mining Institute in Petroșani. Throughout his career span, he played with many first-class Romanian musicians including Radu Goldiș. Moculescu was married four times and had two children. He died on 12 November 2025, at the age of 88.

== Compositions ==
- Mireasma ploilor tîrzii (1985)
- Vară sentimentală (1986)
- Primăvara bobocilor (1987)
- Maria și marea (1989)
- Secretul armei... secrete! (1989)
- Miss Litoral (1991)
- Pistruiatul (1973)

== Film music ==
- Pistruiatul (1973)
- Nu filmăm să ne amuzăm (1974)

== Distinctions ==
- Marele Premiu al Uniunii Compozitorilor și Muzicologilor din România (2008) ("The Grand Prize of the Romanian Composers' Union")
