= Dorin Liviu Zaharia =

Romanian musician, composer, and writer

Dorin Liviu Chubby Zaharia (Romanian pronunciation: [doˈrin ˈlivju zahaˈri.a]; September 25, 1944 – December 3, 1987) was a Romanian musician, composer, poet, essayist, and philosopher.

A "completely unclassifiable", "nearly mythical figure", Zaharia was an autodidact in all he undertook (he studied for about two years at the University of Bucharest's Faculty of Letters, and another two at the Faculty of Philosophy, without completing any of them).

Nicknamed "Chubby" (sometimes spelled as Ciabi) by his peers in the Popa Nan neighborhood because of his propensity to imitate Chubby Checker, Zaharia was the lead singer of Olympic '64, arguably one of the first Romanian bands interested in mixing Romanian folklore music with the popular music of the 1960s. Together with the other band members he composed the rock suites Decameronul focului alb ("The White Fire's Decameron", 1969) and Karma Kaliyuga (1971), but both are now considered lost, as no recordings have survived.

Zaharia was interested in Indian philosophy and mysticism, and he became the spiritual leader, the "shaman", of a group of friends, the so-called Group of Seven (consisting of Ioan Petru Culianu, Dorin Liviu Zaharia, Şerban Anghelescu, Dumitru Radu Popa, Victor Ivanovici, Silviu Angelescu şi Paul Drogeanu). Zaharia was used as a model by Ioan Petru Culianu in two short stories, Oglinda ovală ("The Oval Mirror",1970) and Istoria III ("History III, 1971).

== Family ==
Zaharia was married to Magdalena Hofmann-Soare, an artist, with whom he had a daughter, Maria. He is buried in Berca. Andrei Oisteanu mentions his wife as "Magda Zaharia".

== Discography ==
- Cântic de Haiduc/Ziua Bradului de Noapte

== Film scores ==
Together, with Dan Andrei Aldea or with others, he composed and interpreted, wholly or partly, the music for several movies, such as:

=== Films directed by Dan Pița and Mircea Veroiu ===
- Nunta de piatră (1973)
- Duhul Aurului (1974)
- Filip cel Bun (1975)
- Tănase Scatiu (1976)

=== Films directed by Ioan Cărmăzan ===
- Ţapinarii (1982)
- Lisca (1983)

=== Film directed by Iulian Mihu ===
- Lumina palidă a durerii (1981)

== Incidental music ==
- Piticul din gradina de vara, (1972, directed by Peter Bokor) music together with Mircea Florian
- Macbeth (1976, at the "Toma Caragiu" Theater, Ploiesti, with Gunther Reininger and Mircea Florian)
- Muntele (1978, directed by Emil Mandrci and Nae Cosmescu)
- Mihai Viteazul (1979, Teatrul Tineretului, Piatra Neamt, directed by Alexandru Dabija)
- Diavolul si bunul Dumnezeu (1981, at Teatrul Mic, Bucharest, )

== Actor ==
- Nunta de piatră (1973)
- Dincolo de pod (directed by Mircea Veroiu)

== Bibliography ==
- Ionescu, Doru, Club A 42 de ani- Muzica tinertii tale, Casa de pariuri literare, 2011, pp. 107–114
- Ionescu, Doru, Timpul chitarelor electrice. Jurnal de Călătorie în Arhiva TVR, Humanitas Educaţional, București, 2006, ISBN 973-28-0910-8
- Caraman-Fotea, Daniela and Nicolau, Cristian, Rock, Pop, Folk... remix, Humanitas Educaţional, București, 2003, ISBN 973-8289-18-1
- Andrei Oisteanu, Dorin Liviu (Chubby) Zaharia. Dupa douazeci de ani, 22, 12 Decembrie, 2007
