= Guitalele =

String instrument

Guitarlele
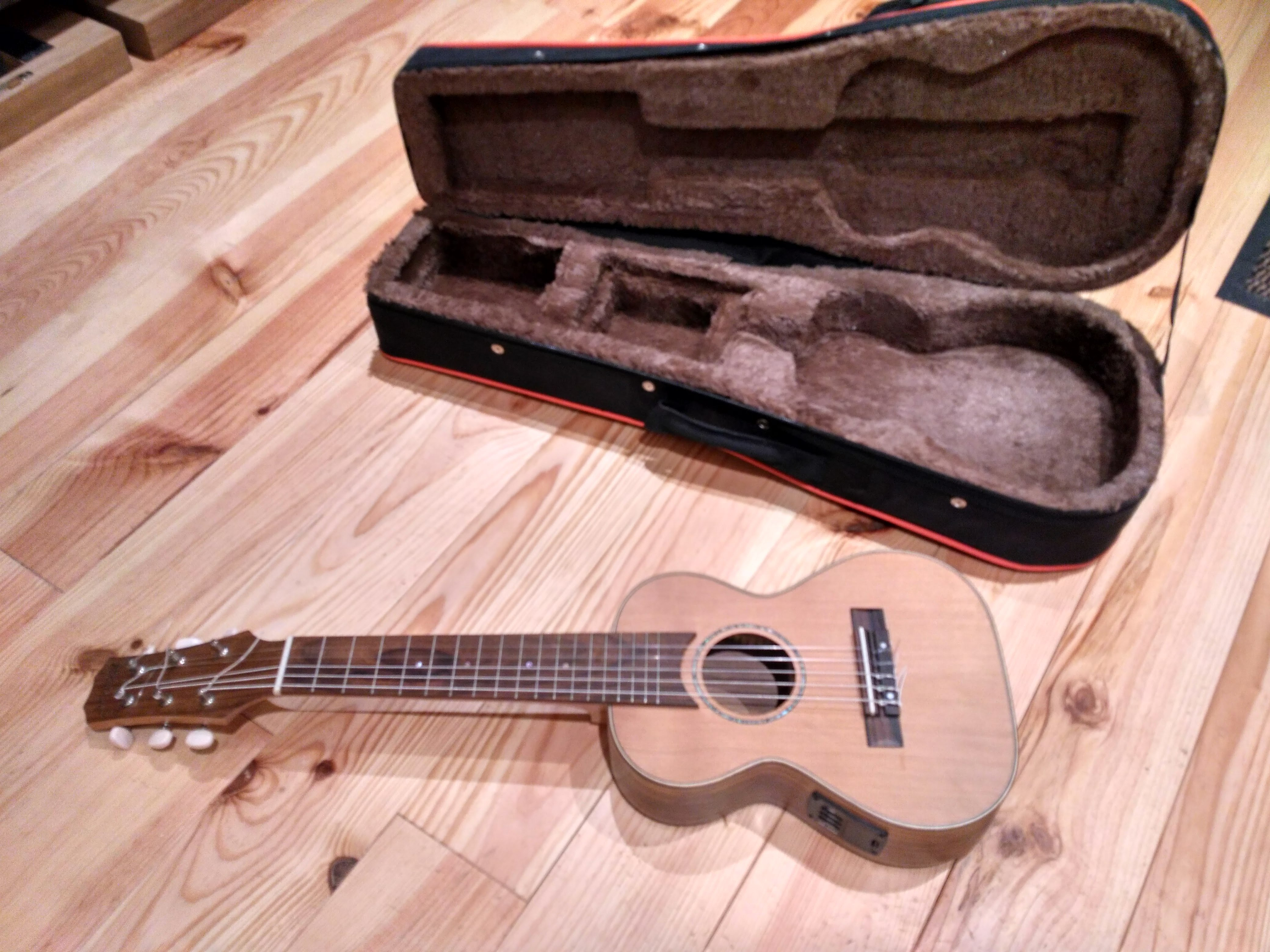
- Other names: Guitarlele, Guilele, Ukitar, Soprano Guitar, Petite Guitar, Kīkū'
- Classification: String instrument

Related instruments
- Classical guitar, Tenor ukulele, Requinto

A guitarlele (sometimes spelled guitalele or guilele), is sometimes also called by brand names such as a ukitar, or kīkū, is a guitar-ukulele hybrid, that is a tenor or baritone ukulele body size, and a cross between a classical guitar and a tenor or baritone ukulele. The guitarlele combines the portability of a ukulele, due to its small size, with the six single strings and resultant chord possibilities of a classical guitar. It may include a built-in piezo saddle element pickup and equalizer preamp that permits playing the guitarlele either as an acoustic guitar or connected to an amplifier. The guitarlele is variously marketed (and used) as a travel guitar or children's guitar. The Guitarlele was introduced by Yamaha in 1997 and is the first commercially produced instrument of its kind. Many people mistakenly claim that it’s based on earlier instruments like the requinto or Quint guitars, but it is not the same in size or timbre.

The requinto does not sound like the guitarlele, since its body is much larger. The same holds true for the 18th-century “quint” guitars.

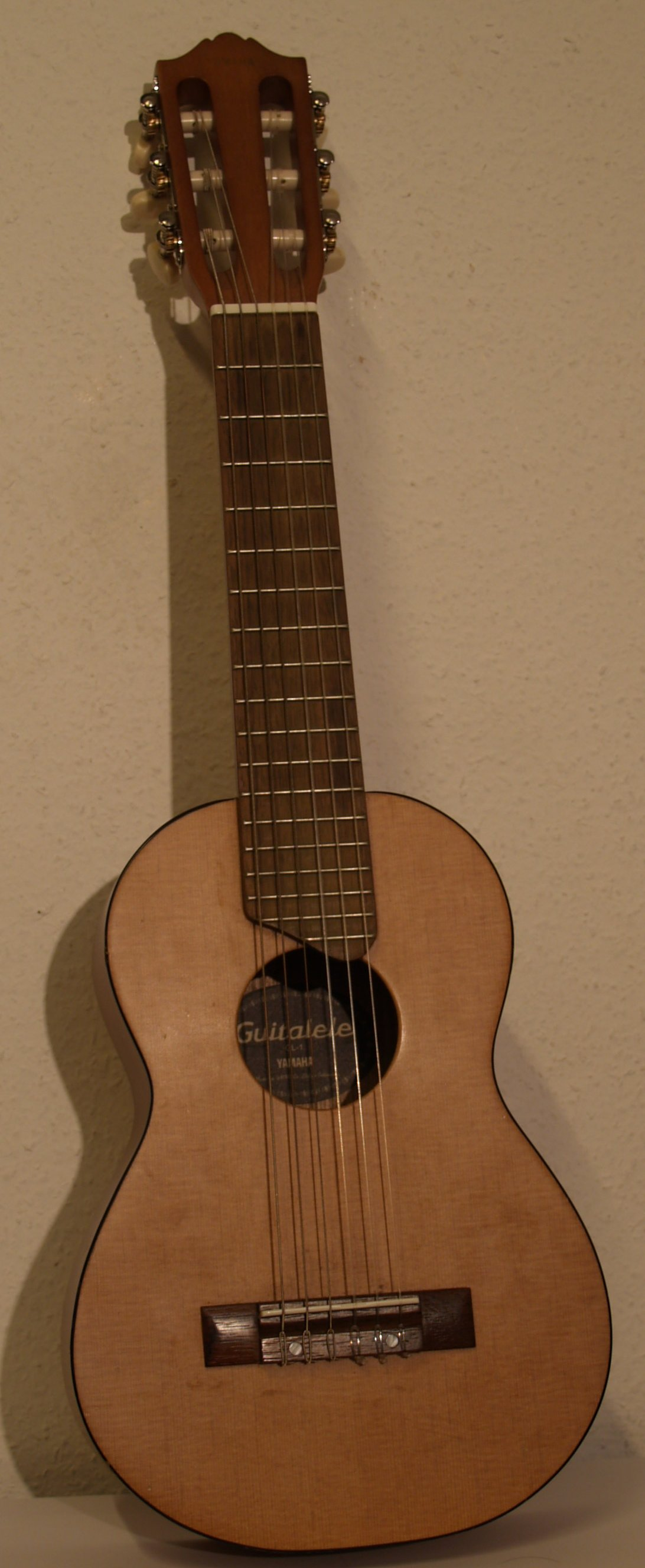
A guitalele or guitarlele

A guitalele is the size of a ukulele, and is commonly played like a guitar transposed up to “A” (that is, up a 4th, or like a guitar with a capo on the fifth fret). This gives it tuning of ADGCEA, with the top four strings tuned like a low G ukulele. This is the same as the tuning of the requinto guitar, although the latter are typically larger than a guitalele, and as the most common tuning for the guitarrón mexicano, albeit at a higher octave.

Several guitar and ukulele manufacturers market guitaleles, Yamaha Corporation's GL-1 Guitalele, was the first commercially available Guitarlele followed by other brands with again slight various names such as: Cordoba's Guilele and Mini, Koaloha's D-VI 6-string tenor ukulele, Mele's Guitarlele, Kanilea's GL6 Guitarlele and Islander GL6, Luna's 6-string baritone ukulele, the Yudelele, the Lichty Kīkū, the Kinnard Kīkū, and the Gretsch guitar-ukulele.

Some manufacturers' (e.g., Luna) use of the term "6-string ukulele" (or the like) in describing their six-string, six-course guitarleles can lead to confusion with the common six-string, four-course ukuleles that are typically referred to by the same name. These four-course "6-string ukuleles" are usually strung with a single G string, a closely spaced course of two (often octave-tuned) C strings, a single E string and a closely spaced course of two (often unison-tuned) A strings. This means that chord formation is more akin to a traditional four-string ukulele, while the Guitarlele's is more akin to a six-string guitar.

== Terminology ==
In Latin America, Brazil, Portugal, and Spain, there is another instrument called a Requinto. In that sense, the new English portmanteau word Guitarlele is a commercial brand used to promote a locally unfamiliar variant of the guitar. Despite the Hawaiian origin of the word Kiku', the term does not reflect origins of the Guitarlele, a commercial creation.

Many sellers avoid naming the instrument altogether as Guitarlele as Yamaha had created this instrument initial again in 1997. Other companies prefer avoid legal infringement issues instead to use descriptive terms like '6-string ukulele' or 'Guitar-Ukulele'. In English, the alternative term Ukitar emerged in parallel, but its usage is not widespread among instrument vendors.

== For Guitarists: Chord Transposition ==
On the guitalele, each chord is played in the guitar chord position of the chord 5 semitones higher, since all strings are tuned 5 semitones higher. For example, Em is played as Bm, and B♭ is played as F.

Chord	C	D	E	F	G	A	B
Chord position	G	A	B	C	D	E	F#
