= Marius Popp =

Marius Popp (21 September 1935, in Sibiu – 8 November 2016) was a Romanian jazz pianist and composer.

Popp, who graduated from the Institute of Architecture Ion Mincu in Bucharest, studied with Maricica Neagu (piano), Ana Severa Benţia (piano), Alexandru Paşcanu (musical theory, solfège, harmony), and Corneliu Gheorghiu (piano).

== Musical activity ==
He has participated in many jazz festivals: Ploiești, Sibiu, San Sebastián, Ljubliana, Prague, Warsaw, Debrecen, Nagykanizsa, Mannheim, Göttingen, Tel Aviv, Russe, Frankfurt am Main, Vienna, Munich, Gărâna, etc. He played with Lionel Hampton when the latter had a concert in București (1971). He was a member of the Mihai Berindei Sextet, of the București Jazz Quartet, and has played with Aura Urziceanu, Pedro Negrescu, Eugen Gondi, Johnny Răducanu, etc. He was a regular of Electrecord's Jazz Series.

He has also collaborated with the Austrian saxophonist Harry Sokal.

Since 1999 he has been a lecturer at the Appenzeller Jazz Days, Switzerland.

== Discography (selection) ==
=== Vinyl LPs ===
- Jazz in trio, Electrecord, 1967
- Panoramic jazz-rock (1977, Electrecord EDE 01266)
- Nodul gordian – Seria jazz nr. 20 (1983, Electrecord EDE 02377)
- Acordul fin. Fine Tuning – Seria jazz nr. 24 (1989, Electrecord EDE 03503)
- Flașnetarium (1995, EDE 04401)
- Margine de lume, 2013

=== CDs ===
- Essential (2006, Electrecord EDC 671) – guest musicians: Peter Wertheimer, Eugen Gondi, Dan Andrei Aldea, Decebal Bădilă, Alin Constanțiu and others.
- Semințe prăjite. Roasted Seeds (2008, Electrecord EDC 889)

== Film scores ==
- Mijlocaș la dechidere (1979, directorț Dinu Tănase)
- Întoarce-te și mai privește o dată (1981, director: Dinu Tănase)
- Destinația Mahmudia (1981, director: Alexandru Boiangiu)
- La capătul liniei (1982, director: Dinu Tănase)
- Galax (director: Ion Popescu-Gopo)
- Rețeaua S. (director: Virgil Calotescu)

== Stage music ==
- Richard III
- Afară în fața ușii
- Astă seară Lola Blau

== Books ==
- Armonia aplicativă în improvizația de jazz, București, Edit. Nemira, 1998
- 34 teme de jazz, București, Edit. Muzicală, 2004

== Awards ==
- Romanian Composers' and Musicologists' Union Award
- UNITER Award
- Romanian Musical Critics' Union Award
- Actualitatea muzicală Magazine's Award
