= Eugen Gondi =

Romanian-born jazz drummer

Eugen Gondi (b. 1947, in Timișoara) is a Romanian-born jazz drummer.

He graduated from the Arts Middle School in his hometown.

He started his musical career by playing with the "Paul Weiner Free Jazz" trio.

He has played with many famous Romanian jazz players, like Marius Popp, Johnny Răducanu, Garbis Dedeian, Radu Goldiş, Pedro Negrescu, Dan Mândrilă, Jan Jankeje, Liviu Butoi. For a time, in 1974, he was the drummer of rock band Phoenix.

He is a former member of Mircea Florian's concept-band Ceata Melopoică.

He participated at several jazz festivals, such as the ones in Ploieşti, Sibiu, San Sebastián, Warsaw, Přerov, and Ljubliana.

After the Romanian Revolution of 1989, he emigrated to the Netherlands.
