= Cristian Soleanu =

Romanian saxophone player

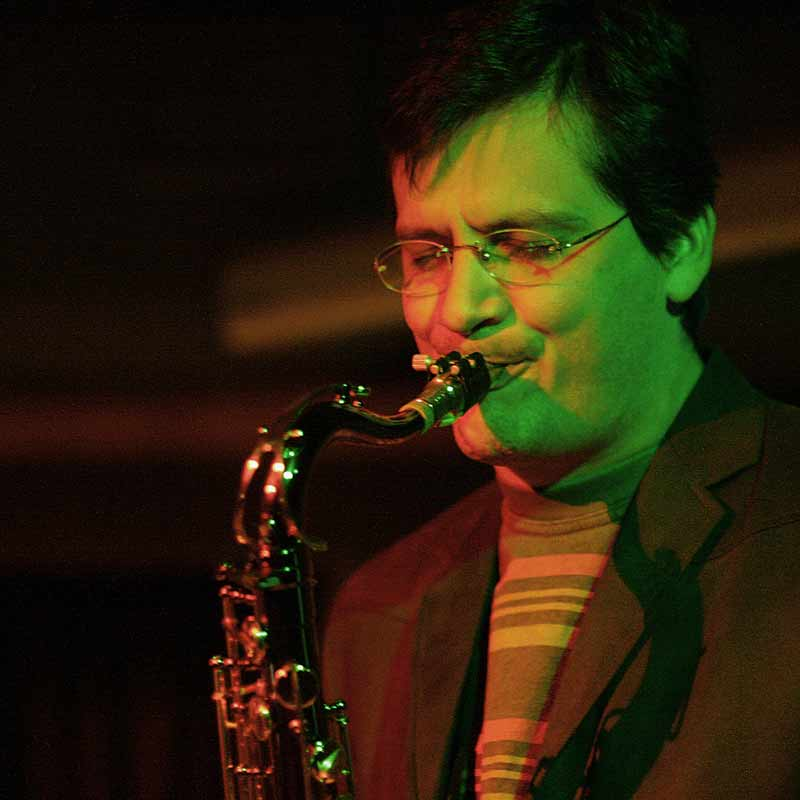

Background information
- Genres: jazz,
- Instrument: saxophone

Cristian Soleanu is a Romanian saxophone player.

== Biography ==
1985 - "George Enescu" High school of music, class of clarinet, teacher Adriana Winkler. 2002-2005 - Music Diploma from National University of Music Bucharest.

1990 - until present, saxophone soloist in the Broadcast Romanian Society Bigband. Fellow worker with jazz musicians and improvised music : [Mircea Tiberian], Decebal Badila, Burton Greene, Dusko Goykovich, Arthur Balogh, Vlad Popescu, Dan Ionescu, Ion Baciu Jr, Aura Urziceanu, Shirley Basie, Alex Harding, Dan Mandrila, Garbis Dedeian, Eugen Nichiteanu, Lucian Ban, and many others. Collaborations with National Radio Orchestra of Romania and Bucharest Philharmonic; with "Archaeus Ensemble".

1992 - 1995 cooperate with theater directors and composers - Alexandru Tocilescu, Cristian Ioan, George Marcu, Mihai Lungeanu - for play and radio theater music. 1995 - music for the contemporary dance performance "Incursiune" by the choreographer Cosmin Manolescu.
"Cristian Soleanu Biography". Archived from the original on 2008-02-25.
"Cristian Soleanu Trio". Archived from the original on 2007-12-22.
"Online Gallery (Bucharest Jazz Festival 2005)". Archived from the original on 2008-03-21.
