= Radu Goldiș =

American jazz musician

Radu Goldiș (born 1947 in Bucharest, Romania) is a Romanian-born American jazz guitarist and composer.

Goldiș is a graduate of the Bucharest Music Conservatory in the musicology department. He was Influenced by Kenny Burrell, Joe Pass, Wes Montgomery, and Rune Gustafsson. He has played with Johnny Răducanu, Eugen Gondi, and Horia Moculescu. He composed music for the Romanian movies Zile fierbinṭi and Accident (both in 1976). With Adrian Enescu he composed music for the Romanian movie Al patrulea stol (1978) and with Petru Mărgineanu he composed the music for the American-Romanian movie Point Zero (1995).

He has worked as an orchestrator for Margareta Pâslaru.

== Discography ==
- Alter Ego (Electrecord, 1980)
- Jazz Restitutio 4 (Spinning Wheel, Electrecord, 1993)
- Romanian Jazz: Jazz from the Electrecord Archives 1966–1978 (Balada, Sonar Kollektiv, 2007
- Unconditional Love
