= Valery Oisteanu =

Romanian-American poet and photographer

- Born: September 3, 1943 (age 83); Karaganda, Kazakh SSR, USSR
- Occupations: Poet, artist, art critic
- Website: www.zen-dada.com

Valery Oisteanu (Romanian: Valeriu Oișteanu [vaˈlerju o.iʃˈte̯anu]; born September 3, 1943) is a Soviet-born Romanian and American poet, art critic, essayist, photographer and performance artist, whose style reflects the influence of Dada and Surrealism. Oisteanu is the author of more than a dozen books of poetry, a book of short fiction, and a book of essays. He is the brother of Romanian historian of religion, cultural anthropologist and writer Andrei Oișteanu.

== Biography ==
Oisteanu was born in Karaganda, Kazakhstan, raised and educated in Romania, where he is known as Valeriu Oișteanu. He graduated from the Department of Chemical Industry of the Politechnical Institute in Bucharest.

In 1970, Oisteanu made his literary debut in Romania with a collection of poems called Proteze. Due to his Jewish ancestry, the Communist regime allowed him to emigrate to New York City in 1972 or 1973, and he has been writing in English ever since.

Oisteanu adopted Dada and Surrealism as a philosophy of art and life. He appears regularly at poetry readings in various New York venues, where he presents original performances of Zen and Dada-inspired "jazzoetry". He is a freelance art critic and on the permanent staff of several arts magazines, including The Brooklyn Rail, NYArts, Rain Taxi, the Spanish publication art.es, and the Canadian magazine D'Art International. Oișteanu is a member of Poets and Writers Inc. in New York and the founder and president of PASS: Poets and Artists Surrealist Society.

== Poetry written in English ==
- Underground Shadows (Pass Press, New York, 1977)
- Underwater Temples (Pass Press, New York, 1979)
- Do Not Defuse (Pass Press, New York, 1980)
- Vis-a-vis Bali (poems and photographic collage; New Observation Press, New York, 1985)
- Passport to Eternal Life (Pass Press, New York, 1990)
- Moons of Venus (Pass Press, New York, 1992)
- Temporary Immortality (Pass Press, New York, 1995)
- ZEN DADA (Linear Art Press, New York, 1999)
- Perks in Purgatory (Fly by Night Press, New York, 2009)
- Anarchy for a Rainy Day (Spuyten Duyvil, New York, 2015)
- Lighter Than Air (Spuyten Duyvil, New York, 2017)
- In the Blink of a Third Eye (Spuyten Duyvil, New York, 2020)
- Here, There and Nowhere (Spuyten Duyvil, New York, 2024)
- Souterain Des Souvenir Deformes (Les Editions Lpb, 2026)

Poetry written or translated to Romanian:

- Proteze ("Prosthesis"), Editura Litera, Bucharest, 1970
- Poeme din Exil ("Poems from Exile"), Editura Paralela 45, Pitești, 2000
- "Anarhie pentru Zile Negre"(Anarchy for a Rainy Day) CDPL, Bucharest,2019
- Privileges in Purgatory (Translated to Romanian) Itaca, Dublin,2020
- Cit ai clipi dintr-al treilea ochi(Translated to Romanian) Editura MLR, Bucharest, 2023

== Prose written in English ==
- The King of Penguins (Linear Arts Books, New York, 2000)
