= Andrei Oișteanu =

Romanian historian

Andrei Oișteanu KSR
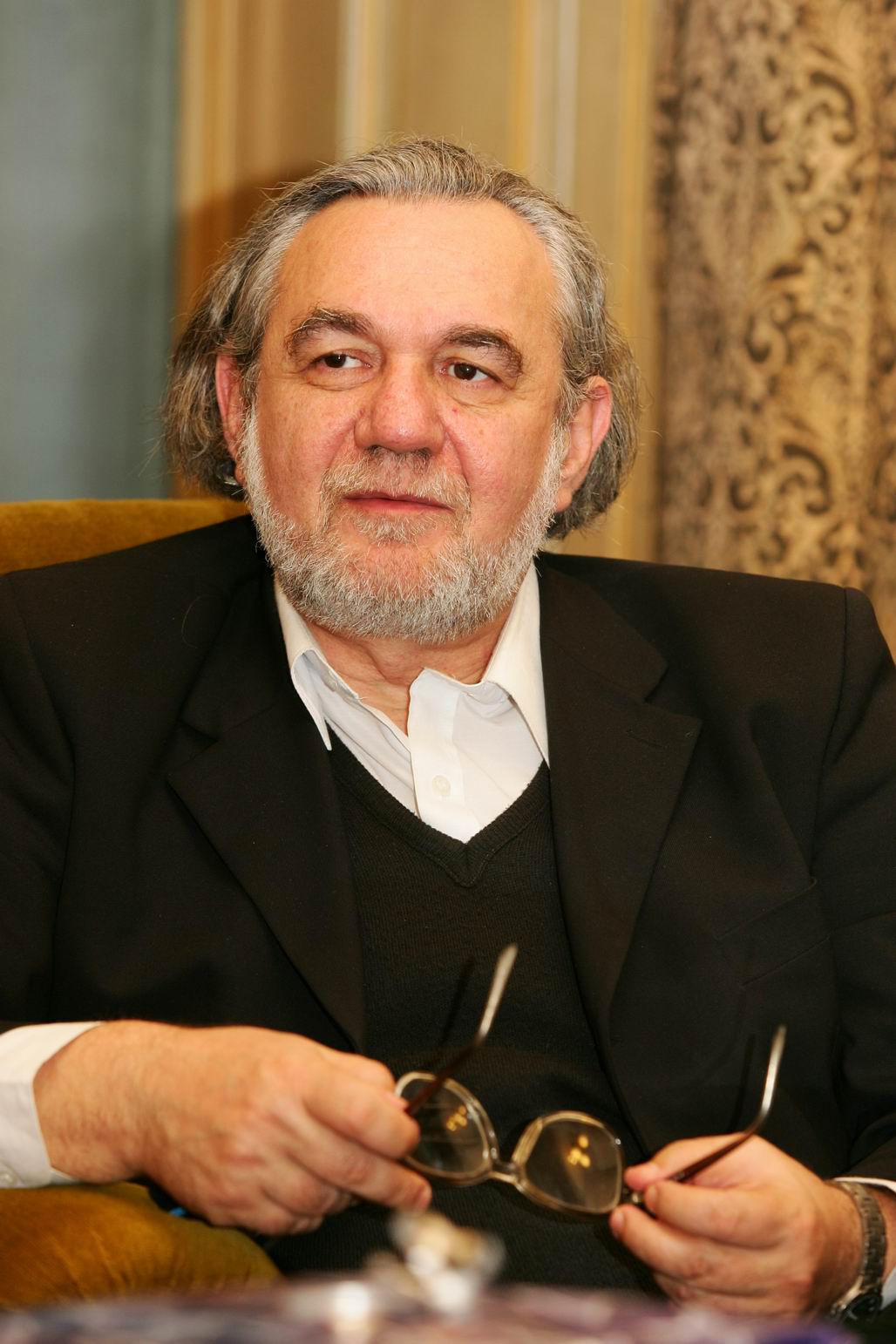
- Born: September 18, 1948 (age 77); Bucharest, Romanian People's Republic
- Occupations: writer historian novelist
- Awards: Order of the Star of Romania, Knight class Order of the Star of Italian Solidarity, Commander class

Andrei Oișteanu KSR (Romanian pronunciation: [anˈdrej o.iʃˈte̯anu]; born September 18, 1948) is a Romanian historian of religions and mentalities, ethnologist, cultural anthropologist, literary critic and novelist. Specialized in the history of religions and mentalities, he is also noted for his investigation of rituals and magic and his work in Jewish studies and the history of antisemitism. After the Romanian Revolution of 1989, he also became noted for his articles and essays on the Holocaust in Romania.

A founding member and researcher at the Institute for History of Religions of the Romanian Academy in Bucharest, he is also the president of the Romanian Association for the History of Religions (RAHR). Oișteanu is professor in the Department for Jewish Studies at the University of Bucharest. He is also member of the educational board of the Elie Wiesel National Institute for Studying the Holocaust in Romania and member of the editorial board of the Journal of Contemporary Antisemitism (Academic Studies Press, Boston). Andrei Oișteanu is a Knight of the Order of the Star of Romania, awarded by the Romanian President (2006), and a Commander of the Order of the Star of Italian Solidarity, awarded by the Italian President (2005).

He is the father of Amana Ferro Oisteanu, EU public affairs expert (Brussels) and the brother of American poet Valery Oișteanu (New York).

== Biography ==
Born into a Jewish family in Bucharest, Oișteanu took a post-graduate course in Oriental Studies at the University of Bucharest (lecturers: Sergiu Al-George and Amita Bhose). During the early 1970s, he was active in Ceata Melopoică, an experimental music and concept band led by Mircea Florian.

In 1997 he took a course in Jewish Studies at the Central European University in Budapest, Hungary (lecturers: Moshe Idel and Michael Silber). Between 1997 and 1999, he had a research grant at the Hebrew University of Jerusalem, International Center for the Study of Antisemitism. In 2002 he had a documentary grant in Germany (Berlin, München, Frankfurt am Main, Düsseldorf) offered by the Goethe-Institut, a grant on "Jewish Identity and Antisemitism in Central and Eastern Europe". In 2005-2006 he had a research grant at the New Europe College Institute for Advanced Studies (as guest of the Rector Andrei Pleșu) on "History of the History of Religions in Romania".

== Works ==
- Grădina de dincolo. Zoosofia. Comentarii mitologice ("The Garden of the World Beyond. Zoosophy. Mythological Commentaries"), Editura Dacia, Cluj, 1980 (second edition, Polirom Publishing House, Iași, 2012).
- Motive și semnificații mito-simbolice în cultura tradițională românească ("Mytho-Symbolical Motifs and Meanings in Romanian Traditional Culture"), Editura Minerva, Bucharest, 1989.
- Cutia cu bătrâni ("The Box with Old People", novel), Preface by Dan C. Mihăilescu, Meta Publishing House, Bucharest, 1995 (second edition, Cartea Românească Publishing House, Bucharest, 2005; third edition, Polirom Publishing House, Iași, 2012).
- Mythos & Logos. Studii și eseuri de antropologie culturală ("Mythos & Logos. Studies and Essays in Cultural Anthropology"), Editura Nemira, Bucharest, 1997 (second edition, 1998).
- Cosmos vs. Chaos. Myth and Magic in Romanian Traditional Culture, illustrated edition, Romanian Cultural Foundation Publishing House, Bucharest, 1999.
- Imaginea evreului în cultura română. Studiu de imagologie în context est-central european ("The Image of the Jew in Romanian Culture. A Study of Imagology in Central-East European Context"), Humanitas Publishing House, Bucharest, 2001 (second edition, Humanitas, 2004; third edition, revised, enhanced and illustrated, Polirom Publishing House, Iași, 2012). The volume was awarded with five major prizes in Romania, Italy, Belgium, and Israel.
- Das Bild des Juden in der rumänischen Volkskultur ("The Image of the Jew in Romanian Popular Culture"), Hartung-Gorre Verlag, Konstanz, 2002.
- Jewish Identity and Antisemitism in Central and South-Eastern Europe, volume edited, foreworded and illustrated by Andrei Oișteanu, Goethe Institut, Bucharest, 2003.
- A Képzeletbeli Zsidó ("The Image of the Jew", translated in Hungarian), Kriterion Publishing House, Cluj, 2005.
- Ordine și Haos. Mit și magie în cultura tradiţională românească ("Order & Chaos. Myth and Magic in Romanian Traditional Culture"), illustrated edition, Polirom Publishing House, Iași, 2004.
- Religie, politică și mit. Texte despre Mircea Eliade și Ioan Petru Culianu ("Religion, Politics and Myth: Texts on Mircea Eliade and Ioan Petru Culianu"), Polirom Publishing House, Iași, 2007 (second edition, revised, enlarged, and illustrated, Polirom Publishing House, Iași, 2014).
- Il diluvio, il drago e il labirinto. Studi di magia e mitologia europea comparata ("The Deluge, the Dragon and the Labyrinth. Comparative Studies in European Magic and Mythology"), A cura di Dan Octavian Cepraga e Maria Bulei, Postfazione di Dan Octavian Cepraga, Edizioni Fiorini, Verona, 2008.
- Inventing the Jew. Antisemitic Stereotypes in Romanian and Other Central-East European Cultures, foreword by Moshe Idel, Nebraska University Press, Lincoln & London, 2009. The author was awarded with the Prize "A.D. Xenopol" of the Romanian Academy (Bucharest, 2011) and the Prize B'nai B'rith Europe (Brussels, 2015) "for an intellectual who has contributed to the changing image of the Jew in society";
- Konstruktionen des Judenbildes: Rumänische und Ostmitteleuropäische Stereotypen des Antisemitismus, Aus dem Rumänischen übersetzt von Larisa Schippel, Frank & Timme Verlag, Berlin, 2010;
- Narcotice în cultura română. Istorie, religie și literatură ("Narcotics in Romanian Culture. History, Religion and Literature") Polirom Publishing House, Iași, 2010 (second edition, 2011; third edition, 2014; forth edition, revised, enlarged and illustrated, Polirom, 2019). The volume was awarded with the Special Prize of the Union of Writers from Romania;
- Les Images du Juif: Clichés antisémites dans la culture roumaine. Une approche comparative, Préface de Matei Cazacu, édition illustrée, Éditions Non Lieu, Paris, 2013.
- Rauschgift in der rumaenischen Kultur: Geschichte, Religion und Literatur, Translated from Romanian by Julia Richter, Frank & Timme Verlag, Berlin, 2013.
- Andrei Oișteanu, Andrei Pleșu, Neagu Djuvara & Adrian Cioroianu, Evreii din România ("The Jews in Romania"), Hasefer Publishing House, Bucharest, 2013.
- Sexualitate și societate. Istorie, religie și literatură ("Sexuality and Society: History, Religion and Literature"), Illustrated edition, Polirom Publishing House, Iași, 2016; Second edition, revised, enlarged and illustrated, Polirom, Iași, 2018. Author's Prize: "The Writers of the Year 2016".
- L´immagine dell'ebreo: Stereotipi antisemiti nella cultura romena e dell'Europa centro-orientale, a cura di Francesco Testa e Horia Cicortas, Collana di Studi Ebraici, Edizioni Belforte, Livorno, 2018.
- Moravuri și nǎravuri. Eseuri de istorie a mentalitǎților ("Good Habits and Bad Habits: Essays on History of Mentalities", Polirom Publishing House, Iași, 2021. The volume was awarded with the Special Prize of the Union of Writers from Romania.
