= Vama Veche =

Village in Constanța County, Romania

Coordinates: 43°45′N 28°34′E

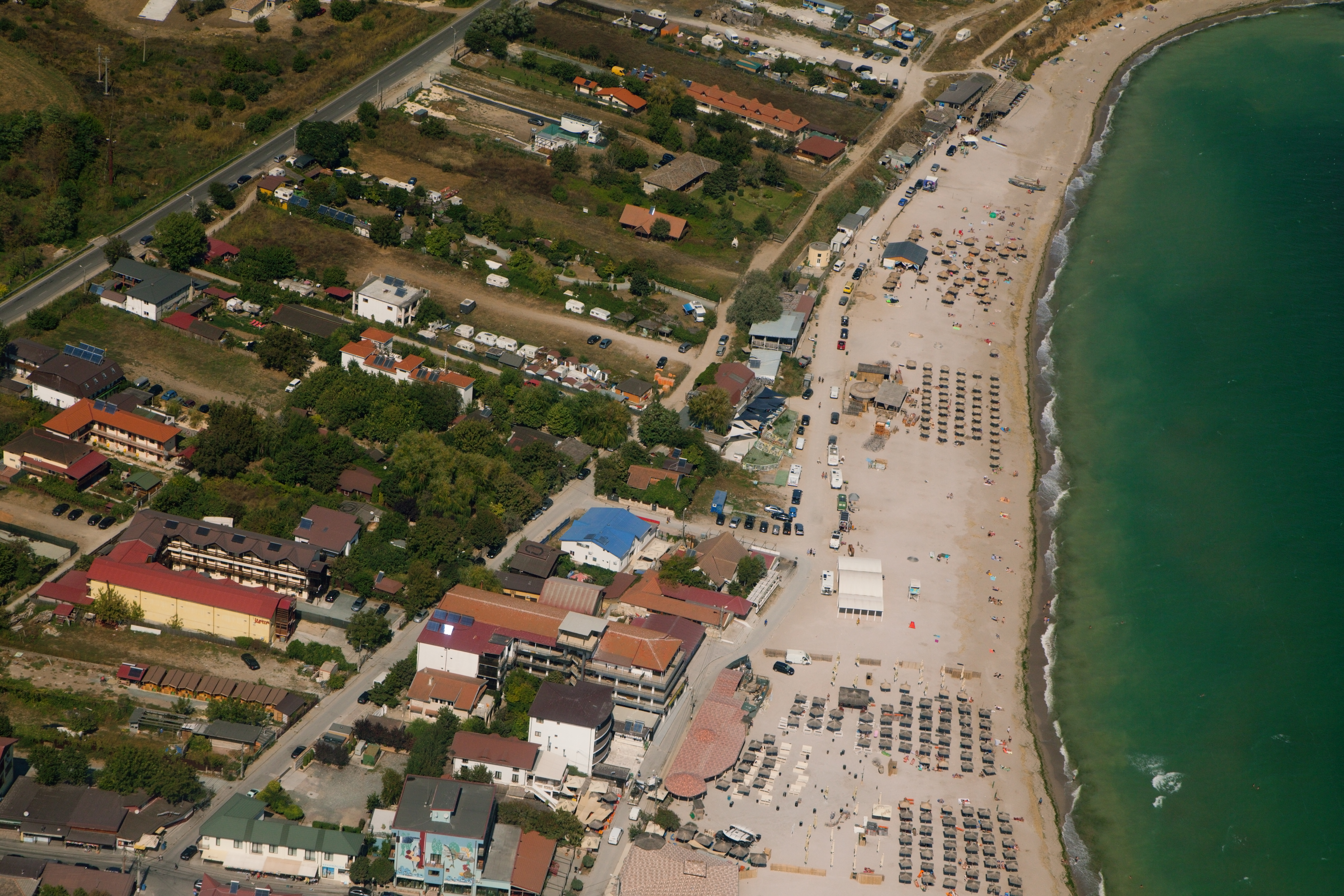
Vama Veche, North

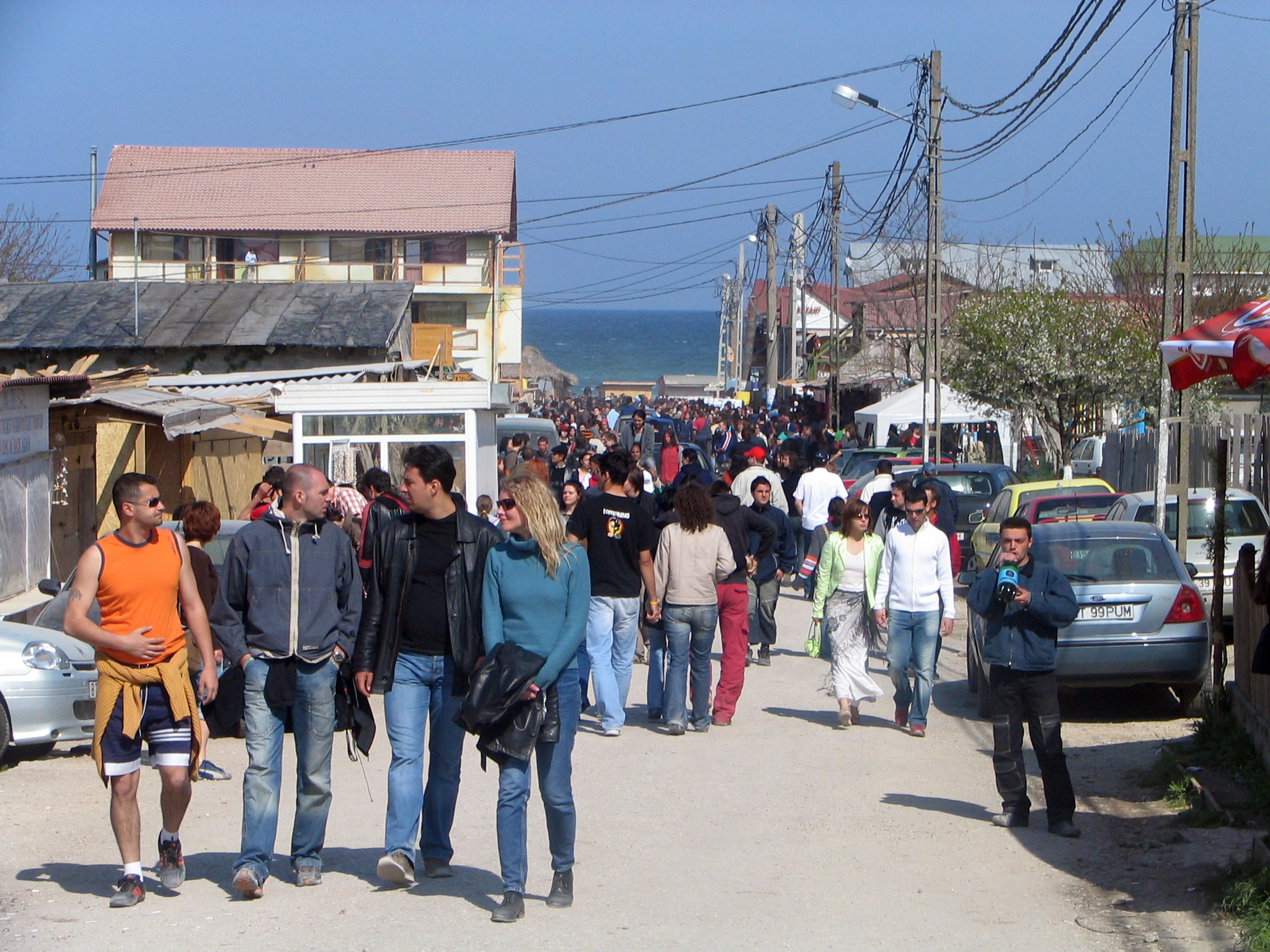
May 1 is usually considered the first day of the summer seaside holiday season

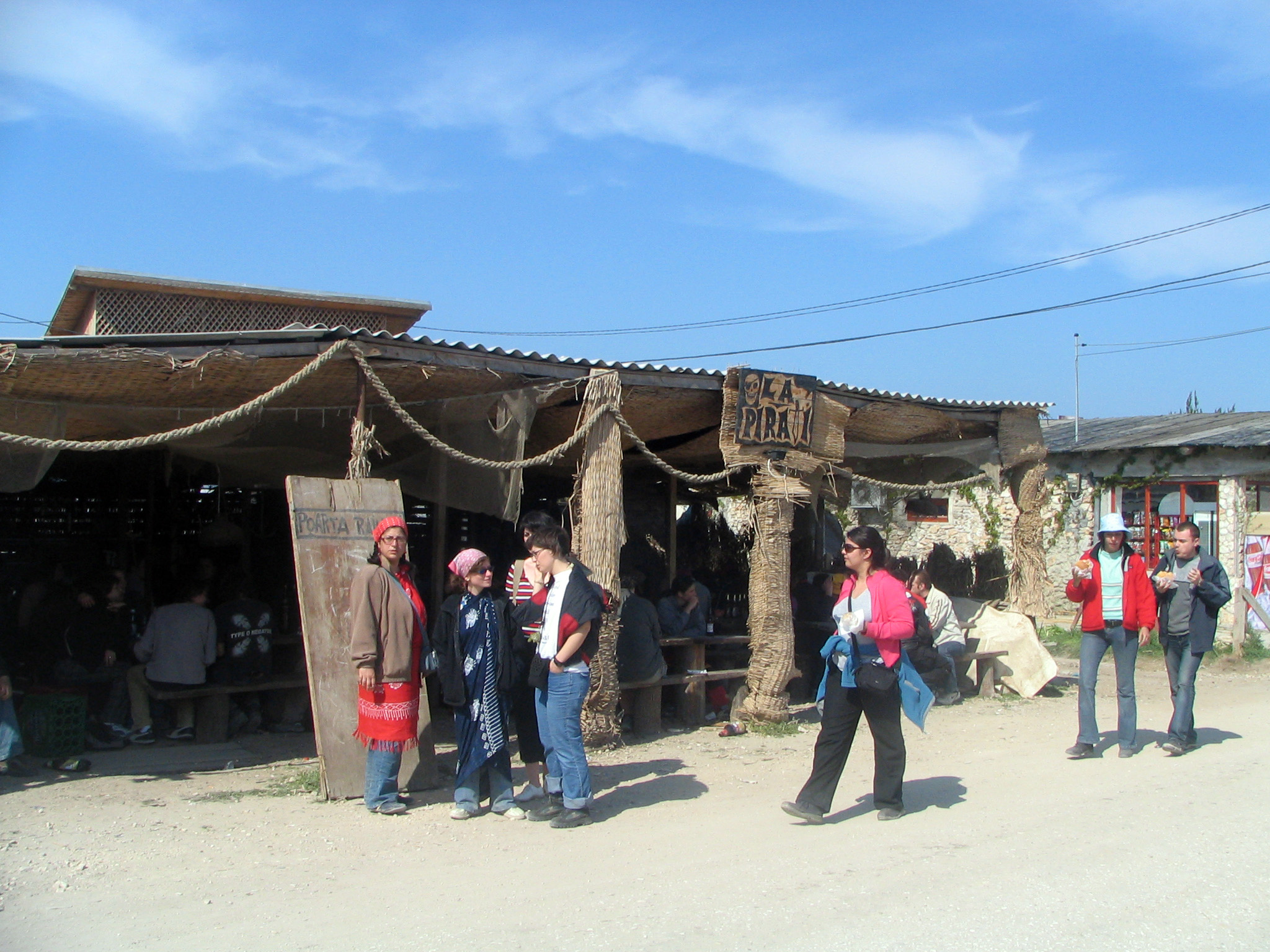
La Piraţi ("At the Pirates") features heavy metal music

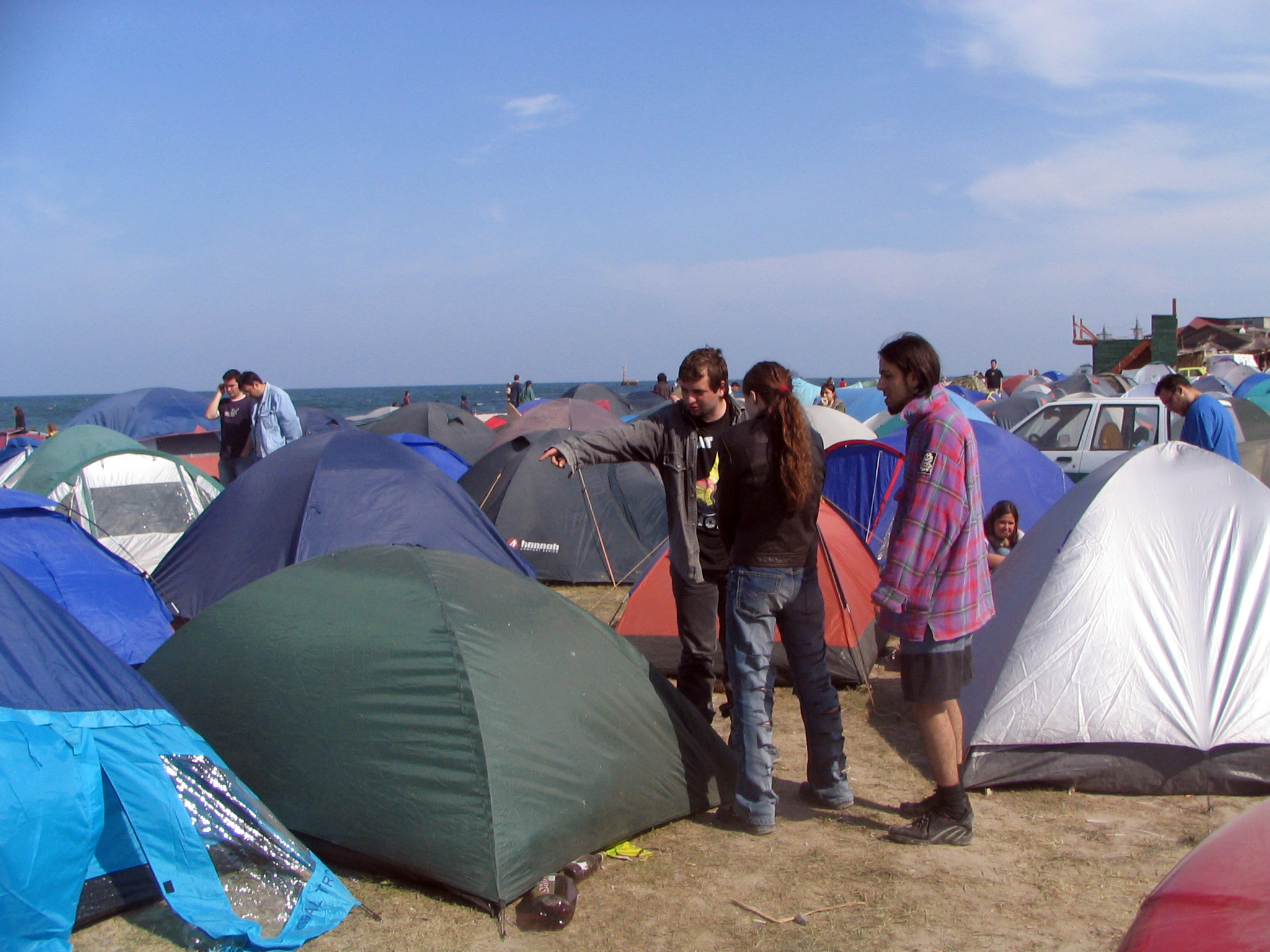
Camping on the beach

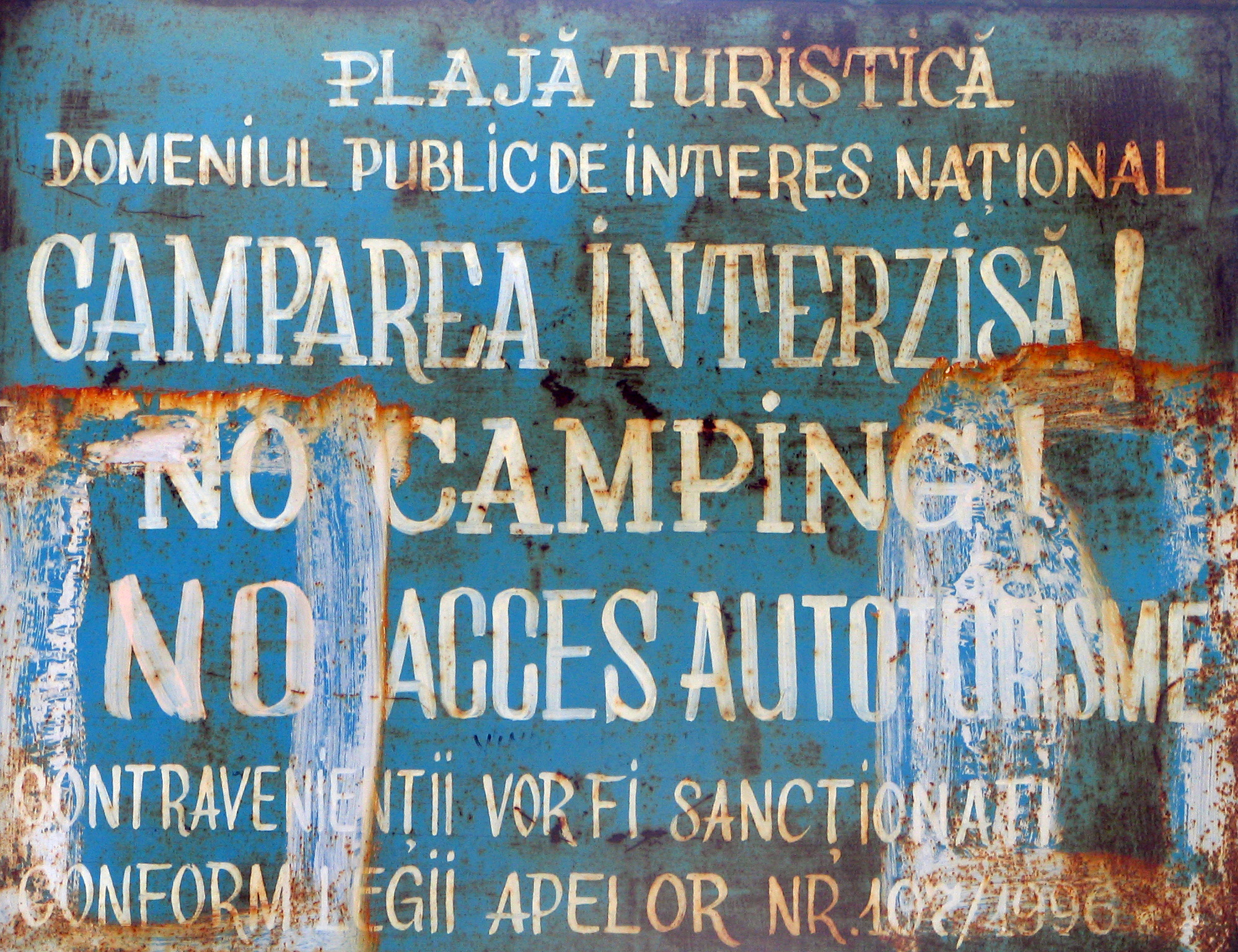
"No Camping" sign on the beach

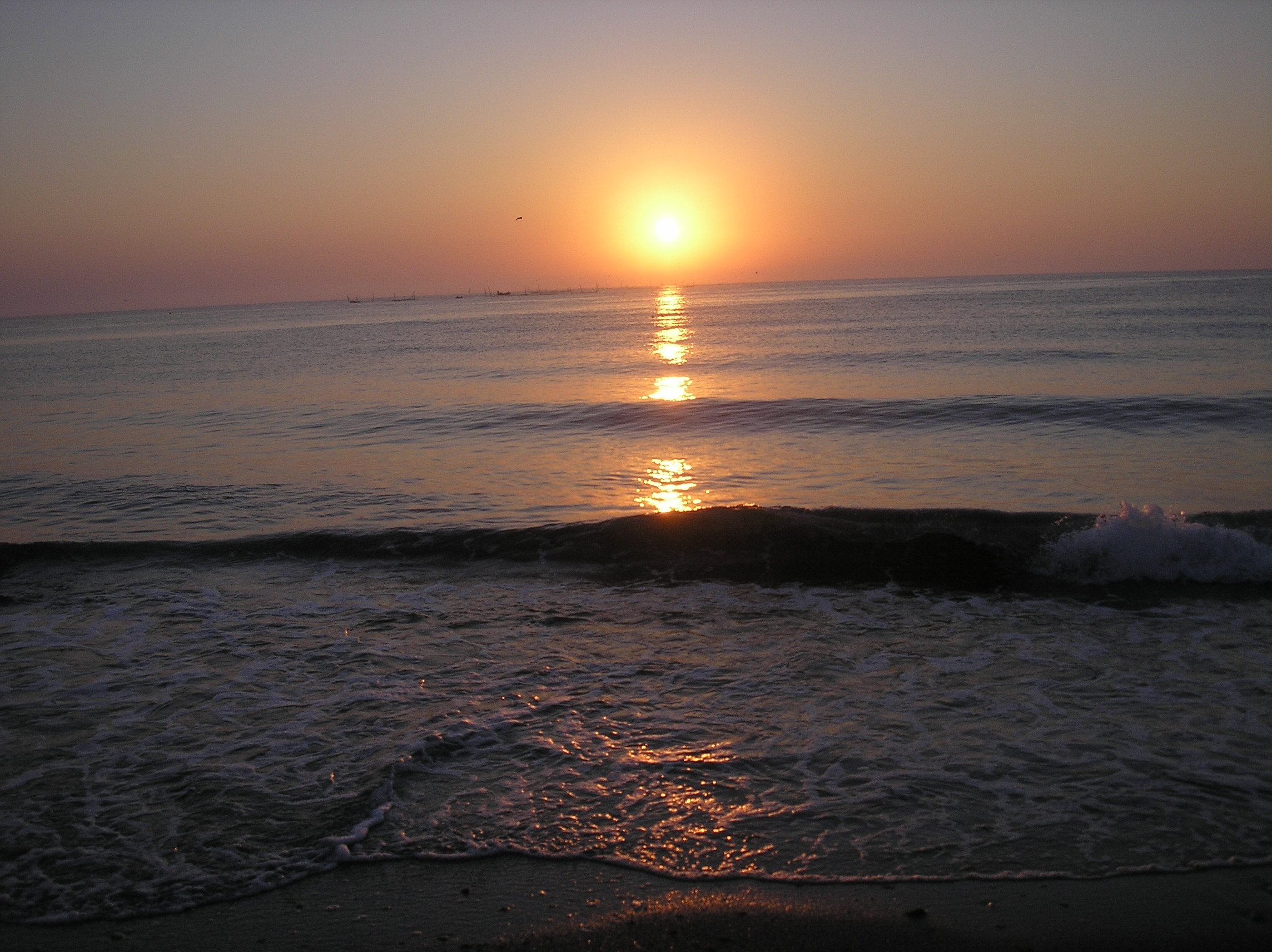
Sunrise at the beach, July 2007

Vama Veche (historical names: Ilanlâk, Ilanlâc, Turkish: Ilanlık) is a village in Constanța County, Romania, on the Black Sea coast, near the border with Bulgaria, at 28.57 E longitude, 43.75 N latitude. It is part of the commune of Limanu and in 2002, it had a population of 178.

== Geography ==
Vama Veche administratively belongs to the commune Limanu. The town is located in Dobrogea, on the shore of the Black Sea, less than one kilometer from the border with Bulgaria.

== History ==
It was founded in 1811 by a few Gagauz families, originally being named "Ilanlîk". Its current name literally means "Old border checkpoint", named so after Southern Dobruja (the Cadrilater) had been included in Romania in 1913. In 1940, however, that region was returned to Bulgaria, and the village has since lain once again near the border, but the name stuck.

Even in Communist Romania, Vama Veche had the reputation of a non-mainstream tourist destination, which had only grown since the Romanian Revolution of 1989. During the communist era, concern for border patrol sight lines spared Vama Veche the development that occurred in other Romanian Black Sea resorts. It became a hangout for intellectuals; for reasons that are not exactly clear, the generally repressive regime of Nicolae Ceauşescu chose to tolerate this countercultural oasis, as long as people had their identity papers with them. Accommodations consisted of tents or rooms rented from peasants or fishermen. While camping is theoretically not permitted, to this day, many visitors or semi-permanent residents still stay in tents on the beach.

== 21st century ==
Famous for its nude beach, since the late 1990s Vama Veche has experienced development and gentrification, which had led to a "Save Vama Veche" campaign that is lobbying for the area's environmental conservation and a halt to development and mass tourism. Nudism is still common on the beach today, especially on the Northern part where the beach ends and the area is less crowded.

A major part of the "Save Vama Veche" campaign is the 2003 founding of the Stufstock music festival. Both "Save Vama Veche" campaign and Stufstock Festival were initiated by the "Association for the Conservation of Bio-Cultural Protected Areas" NGO. The August 2003 festival drew a crowd of about 10,000. The 2004 edition drew about 20,000 people. The 2005 Stufstock drew a record 40,000-large crowd, formed mainly by rockers, bohemians, punkers and goths. In 2004, legislation was enacted, limiting construction of new housing and roads or paving of existing roads. As of 2006, this seems to be enforced, with no visible new permanent structures being built within the preceding year. Given the fact that it was considered an outlaw's beach and a nice hippie place to spend a vacation, for many years, it was considered an aquatic heaven.

In the 80s, there were 20 species of commercial used fish in that area of the Black Sea, while now, there still are 5-6. In the annual report from the National Institute for Marine Development - Grigore Antipa, is stipulated that in Vama Veche are 220 species with different grades of endangerment, while 23% are extinct due to human and toxic waste.

== Image gallery ==
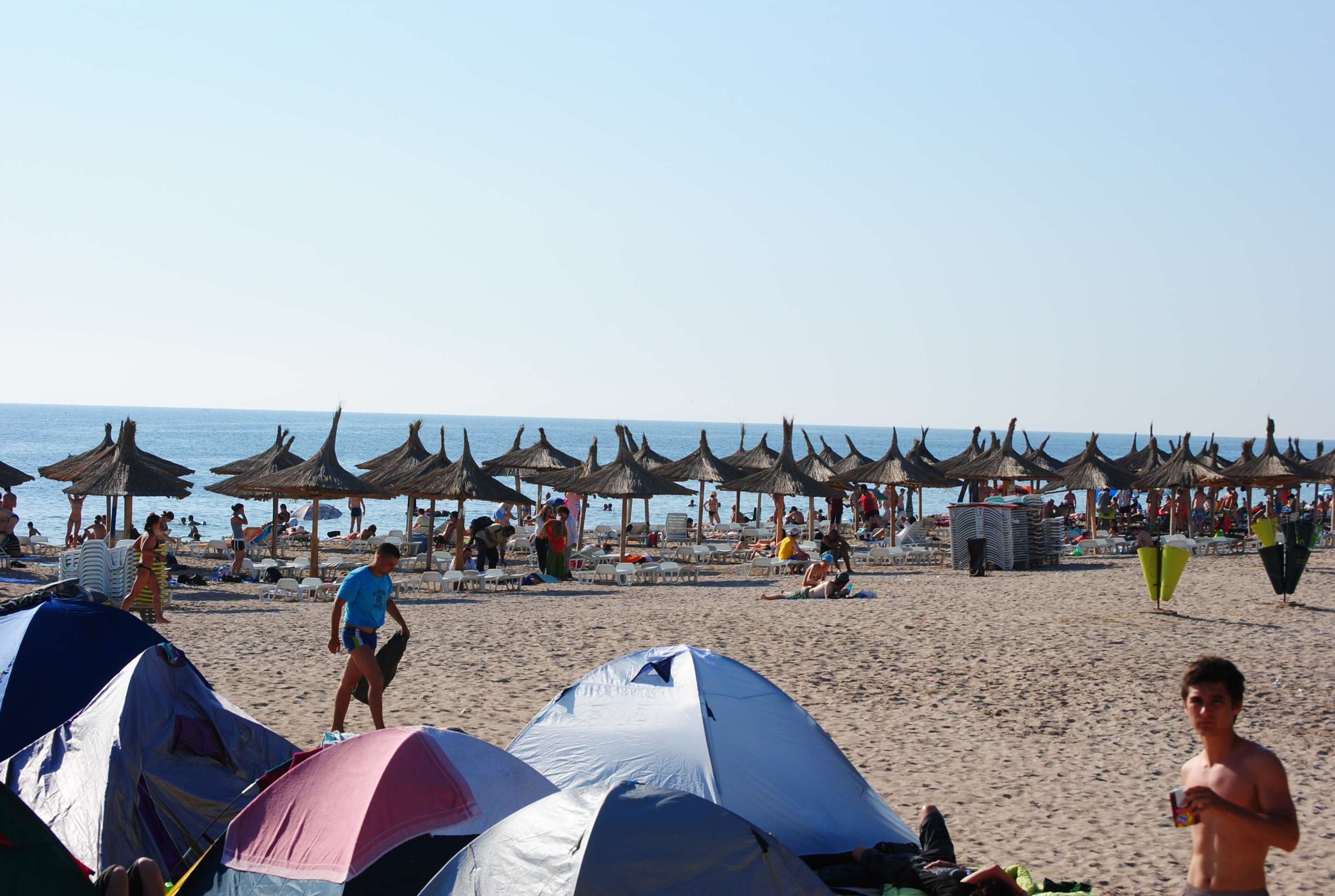
Vama Veche 2010

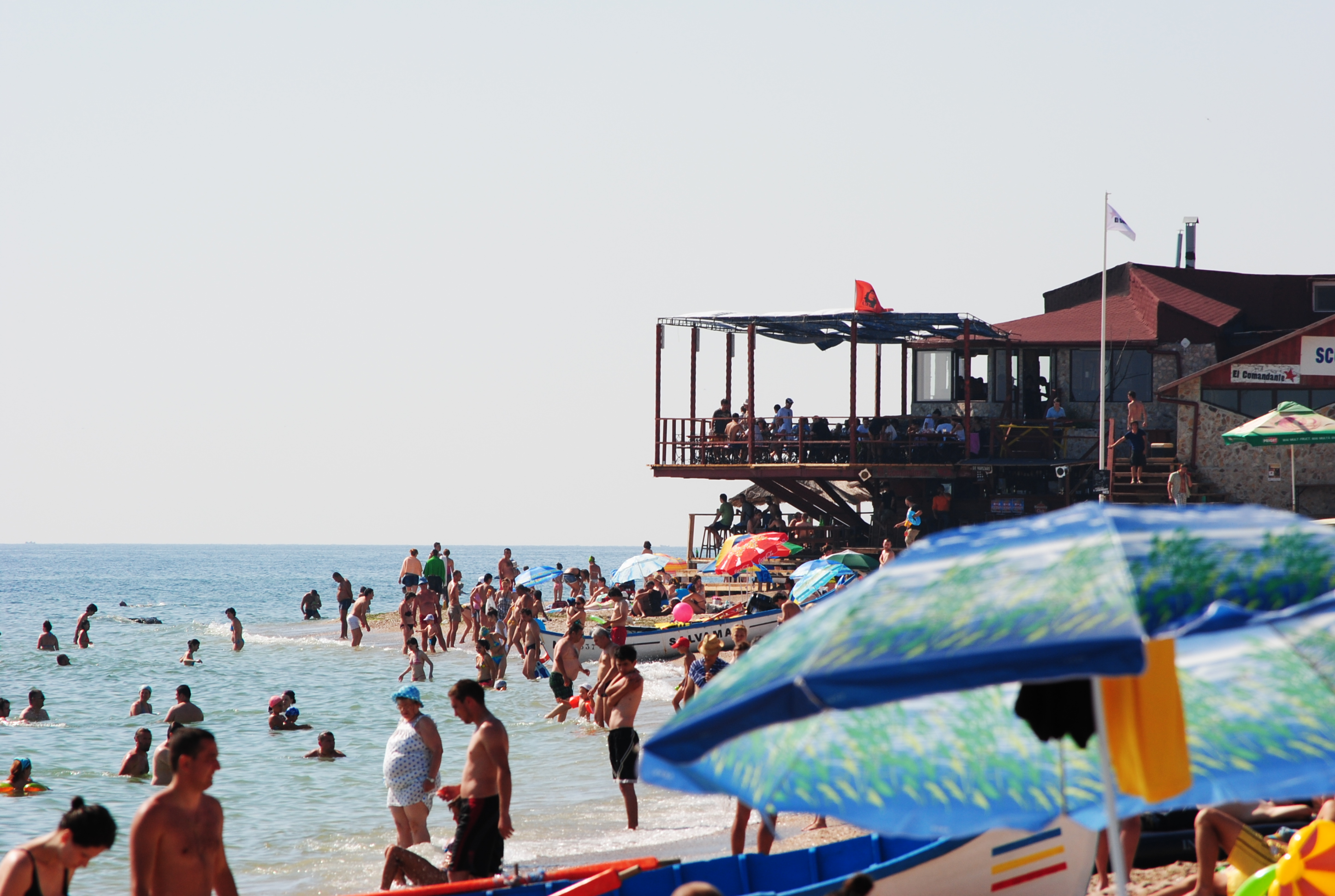
Corsarul 2010

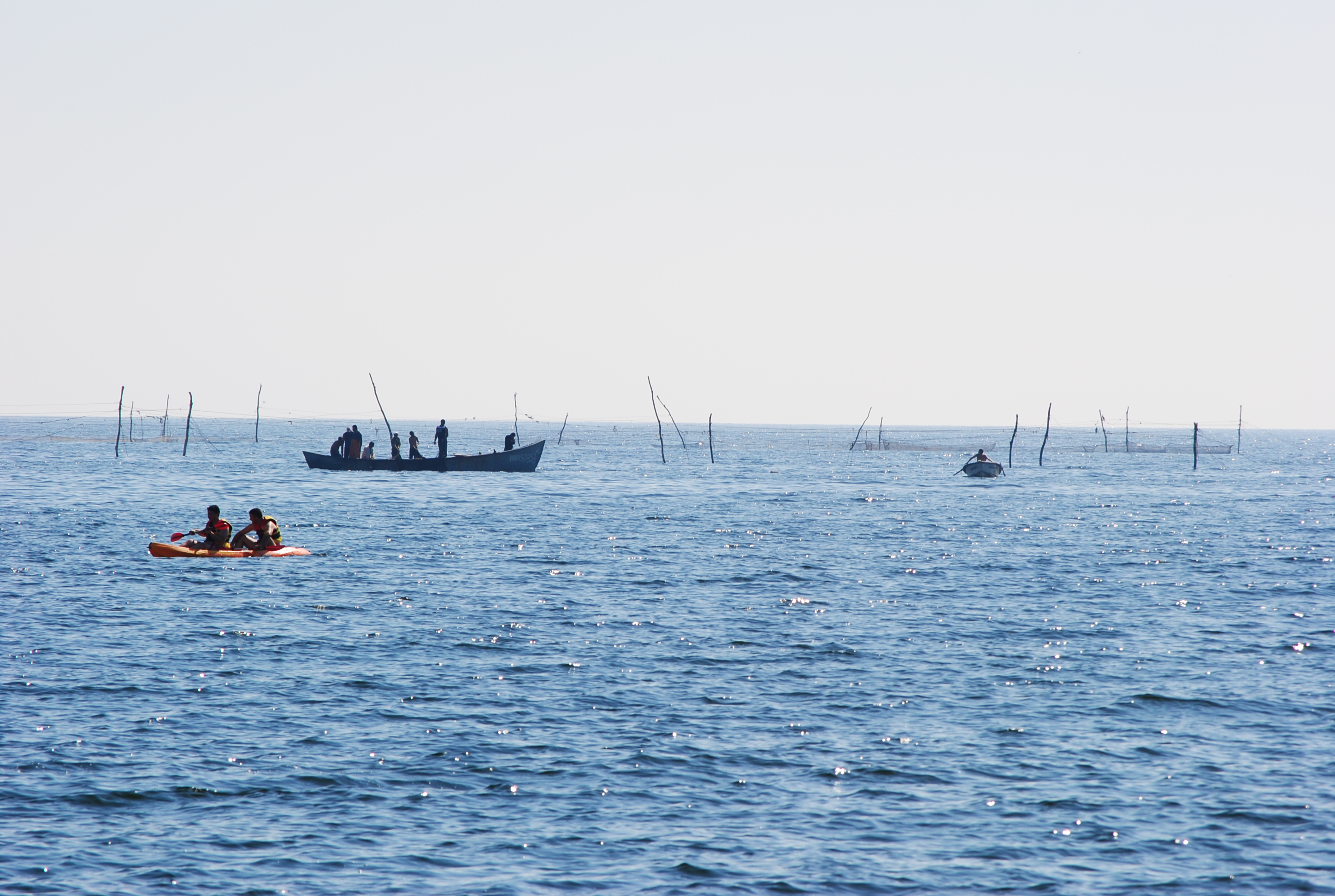
Fishermen in Vama Veche

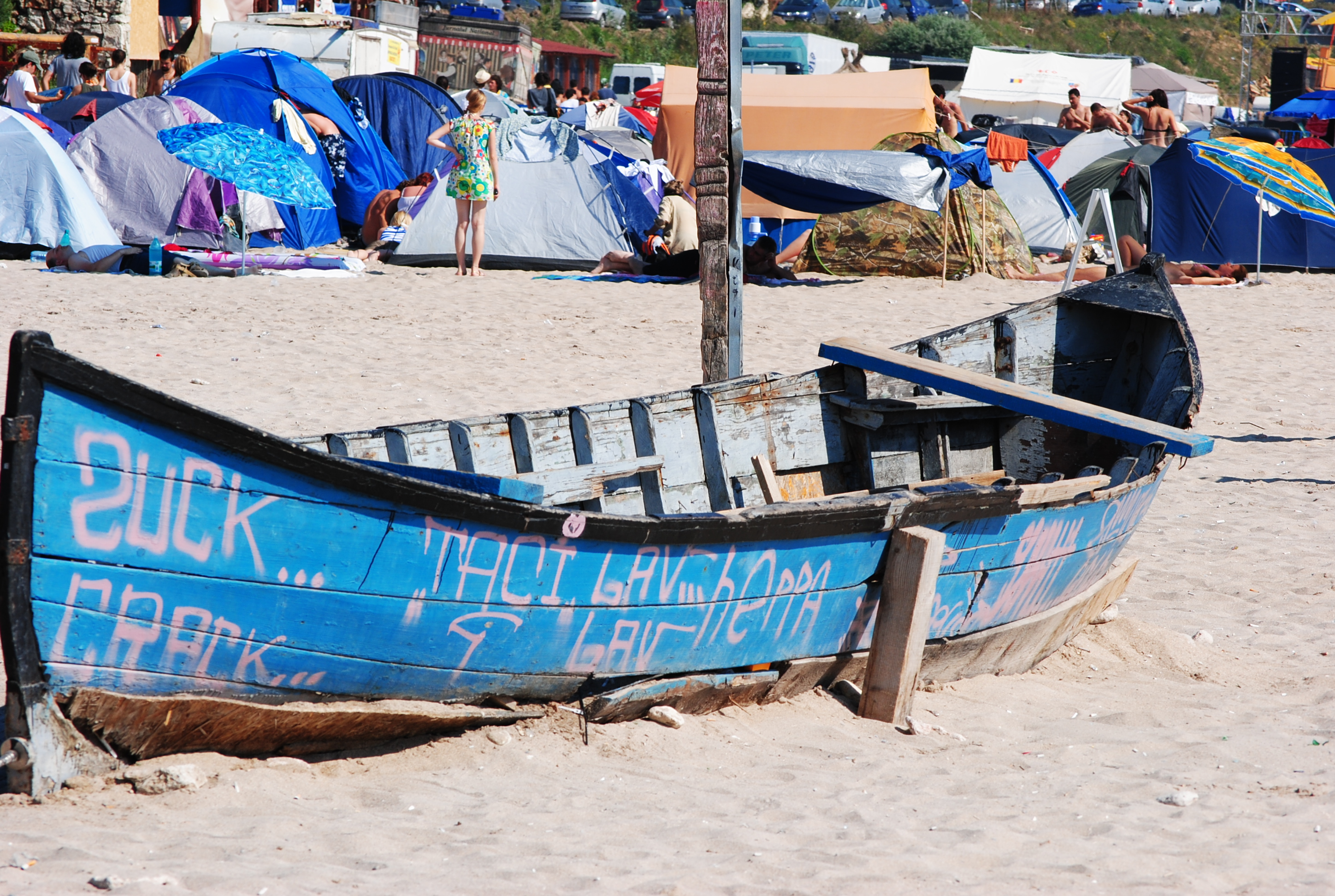
Boat
