= Costin Petrescu (painter) =

Romanian painter

Costin Petrescu (May 10, 1872 – October 15, 1954) was a Romanian painter. Born in Pitești, he moved to Bucharest in 1892, attending the Fine Arts School for three years. He executed the monumental fresco in the Romanian Athenaeum between 1934 and 1939.

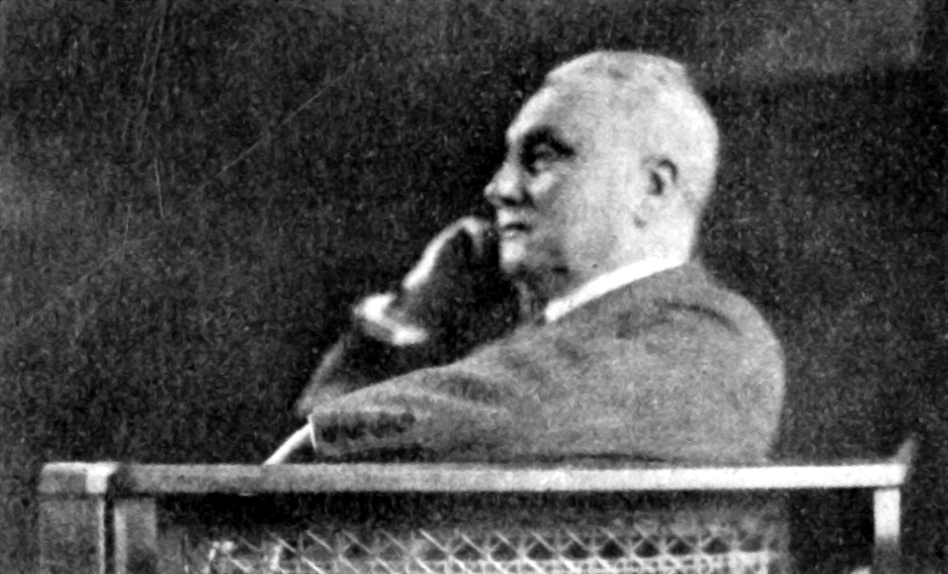
