= Johnny Răducanu =

Romanian jazz pianist (1931–2011)

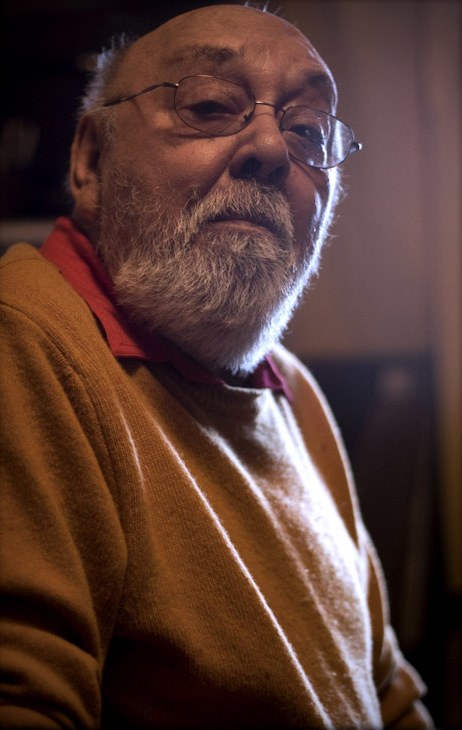
- Răducanu in 2009

Background information
- Also known as: Johnny Răducanu
- Born: Răducan Crețu; 1 December 1931; Brăila, Kingdom of Romania
- Died: 19 September 2011 (aged 79) Bucharest, Romania
- Genres: Jazz
- Occupations: Musician, composer
- Instruments: Double bass, piano
- Years active: 1950–2010
- Label: Electrecord

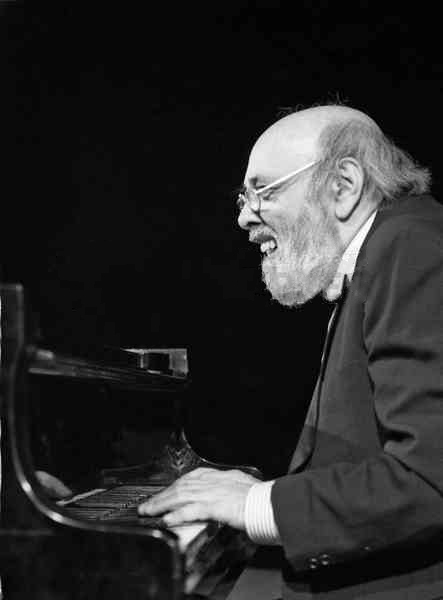
Răducanu in 1992

Johnny Răducanu (born Răducan Crețu; 1 December 1931 – 19 September 2011) was a Romanian Romani jazz pianist, whose family has a long musical tradition dating back to the 17th century.

He was born in Brăila and started playing the double bass at the age of 19 before switching to piano. During his musical career, some of his many collaborations outside Romania were those with Art Farmer (trumpet) and Slide Hampton (trombone), and Friedrich Gulda (piano). In 1987, Răducanu received an honorary membership in the Louis Armstrong Academy in New Orleans. He was the founder of the Romanian Jazz school, and during a musical career spanning over half a century, he discovered, nurtured and trained several generations of Romanian jazz musicians. Leonard Feather called him "Mr. Jazz of Romania". He was the President of the Romanian Jazz Federation. Răducanu was married to Geta Costin from 1962 to 1970.

Răducanu died at his apartment in Oltarului Street in Bucharest and is interred in a local cemetery in Cernica, Ilfov County, close to the capital.

== Discography ==
- Jazz trio – Seria jazz nr. 4 (Electrecord, 1966)
- Jazz în țara mea (Jazz in my country) (Electrecord, 1967)
- Confesiuni (Electrecord, 1979)
- Confesiuni II (Electrecord, 1982)
- Confesiuni III – Seria jazz nr. 21 (Electrecord, 1986)
- Jazz Made in Romania (Electrecord, 1987)
- To His Friends (Alpha Publishing, 1996)
- Jazz Behind the Carpathians – Johnny Raducanu meets Theodora Enache (Green Records, 1999)
- Jazz antifanariot (Anastasia, 2002)
- Jazz Made in Romania – Live in San Francisco (Mediaround Inc./Intercont Music, 2002)
- Jazz Bestament (Tescani Productions, 2005)
- Chamber Jazz Music (Soft Productions, 2008)
- Inside Stories – Jazz Poems (Tvr Media, 2009)

== Books ==
- Singurătatea, meseria mea (Regent House Printing & Publishing, 2002)
- Țara lui Johnny (Vivaldi, 2005)
