= 2020 in classical music =

This article lists major events and other topics related to classical music in 2020.

== Events ==
- 1 January – At the 2020 Vienna New Year's Concert, Andris Nelsons plays the trumpet solo in the Postillon-Galopp of Hans Christian Lumbye, the first conductor to perform a solo in the Vienna New Year's Concert who is not a violinist. Nelsons performed the same solo on the 30 December 2019 and 31 December 2019 performances of the same programme.
- 5 January – Island City Opera announces the postponement of its planned March 2020 production of The Wreckers by Dame Ethyl Smyth, because of concerns about compliance with California Assembly Bill 5 (2019).
- 6 January – Annapolis Opera announces the appointment of Craig Kier as its next artistic director and music director, effective 1 July 2020.
- 7 January – The National Ballet of Canada announces the appointment of Maria Seletskaja as the first-ever conductor to its newly created post of conductor-in-residence.
- 8 January
  - The Teatro San Cassiano names the Academy of Ancient Music as its first associate ensemble.
  - The Zurich Festival {Festspiele Zürich} announces that the 2020 festival is to be its final festival, because of the lack of long-term financial support to continue the festival.
  - The Los Angeles Chamber Orchestra announces the appointment of Ben Cadwallader as its next executive director, effective 9 March 2020.
  - The Vermont Symphony Orchestra announces that Ben Cadwallader is to stand down as its executive director on 7 February 2020.
  - Martijn Padding receives the Andreaspenning award at the Concertgebouw, Amsterdam, in recognition of his services to musical life in Amsterdam.
- 9 January – The Jacksonville Symphony announces the appointment of Steven Libman as its next president and chief executive officer.
- 13 January
  - The Australian Festival of Chamber Music announces the appointment of Jack Liebeck as its next artistic director, in succession to Kathryn Stott, following the conclusion of the 2020 festival.
  - Opera Holland Park announces simultaneously the scheduled retirement of Michael Volpe as its general director on 30 September 2020, and the appointment of James Clutton as the company's new chief executive and director of opera, effective 1 October 2020.
  - The Bavarian Radio Symphony Orchestra announces that it is to award its Karl Amadeus Hartmann Medal posthumously to Mariss Jansons.
  - The city of Hamburg awards its Johannes Brahms Medal to Christoph von Dohnányi.
- 14 January – The Franz Liszt Chamber Orchestra announces the appointment of István Várdai as its new artistic director.
- 15 January
  - The Hamburger Symphoniker announces violist Timothy Ridout as the inaugural winner of its newly established Sir Jeffrey Tate Prize.
  - The Vancouver Symphony announces the appointment of Angela Elster as its new president and chief executive officer, with immediate effect.
- 16 January – The Royal Swedish Opera announces the appointment of Alan Gilbert as its next music director, effective in the spring of 2021.
- 17 January – Vladimir Ashkenazy announces his retirement from public performance, effective immediately.
- 18 January - John Williams at the helm of the Wiener Philharmoniker makes his concert debut in continental Europe.
- 20 January
  - The Verbier Festival announces the appointment of James Gaffigan as the next music director of the Verbier Festival Junior Orchestra, effective with the 2021 festival season.
  - The Markgräflichen Opernhaus Bayreuth announces the establishment of its new 'Bayreuth Baroque' Festival, with the appointment of Max Emanuel Cencic as its artistic director, with an initial contract of 3 years.
  - The Ernst von Siemens Musikstiftung announces Tabea Zimmermann as the recipient of the 2020 Ernst von Siemens Music Prize.
- 22 January
  - The Boston Symphony Orchestra announces that Mark Volpe is to retire as its president and chief executive officer, effective February 2021.
  - The Detroit Symphony Orchestra announces the appointment of Jader Bignamini as its next music director, effective with the 2020–2021 season, with an initial contract of 6 seasons.
- 23 January
  - The Mozarteum Orchestra Salzburg announces the appointment of Siegwald Bütow as its new managing director, effective in the summer of 2020.
  - From the Top announces the appointment of Peter Dugan as the new permanent host for its eponymous radio programme, as of the 2020–2021 season, along with the appointments of Vijay Gupta, Tessa Lark, Alex Laing, Orli Shaham, and Charles Yang as co-hosts and creative partners.
- 24 January
  - The London Philharmonic Orchestra announces simultaneously the scheduled retirement of Timothy Walker as its chief executive and artistic director, effective 3 June 2020, and the appointment of David Burke as its next chief executive, along with a planned division into separate roles each of the posts of chief executive and of artistic director.
  - The Mecklenburg State Theatre announces the appointment of Mark Rohde as its next Generalmusikdirektor, effective with the 2020–2021 season.
  - Fort Worth Opera announces the resignation of Tuomas Hiltunen as its general director, with immediate effect.
- 28 January – The Chicago Symphony Orchestra confirms that Riccardo Muti is to conclude his music directorship of the orchestra at the close of the 2021–2022 season.
- 30 January
  - The Léonie Sonning Foundation announces Unsuk Chin as the recipient of the Léonie Sonning Music Prize 2021.
  - The Boston Symphony Orchestra cancels its planned tour of Asia, the first American orchestra to cancel overseas travel in the wake of the COVID-19 outbreak.
- 31 January
  - The Staatskapelle Halle announces the resignation of Ariane Matiakh as its Generalmusikdirektorin.
  - The Südwestdeutsche Philharmonie Konstanz announces that Ari Rasilainen is to conclude his chief conductorship of the orchestra at the close of the 2020–2021 season.
- 1 February
  - The Orchestre National de Lille performs the final concert of its UK tour at Leeds Town Hall, the last European orchestra to perform in the United Kingdom just prior to and after the UK's departure from the European Union.
  - Never heard live during the composers lifetime, the opera The Chronicle of Nine: The Tragedy of Queen Jane, composed by Arnold Rosner to a libretto by Florence Stevenson, receives its world premiere performance at Jordan Hall, Boston, presented by Odyssey Opera and the Boston Modern Orchestra Project.
- 3 February – Opera Carolina makes redundant its executive director, Beth Hansen, citing fiscal challenges to the company.
- 4 February – The St. Louis Symphony Orchestra announces that Amy Kaiser is to retire as director of the St. Louis Symphony Chorus, at the close of the 2020–2021 season.
- 5 February
  - Radio New Zealand announces plans to discontinue its FM classical music radio station RNZ Concert, and to shift its classical music broadcasting over to an automated programme on its AM channel and in streaming format.
  - Stéphane Lissner announces the cancellation of three new opera productions for the 2020-2021 Opéra de Paris season, in the wake of the recent industrial action at the Opéra de Paris.
  - The Washington Chorus announces the appointment of Eugene Rogers as its next artistic director, effective July 2020.
  - The Ravinia Festival announces the appointment of Marin Alsop as its new chief conductor and curator, the first person to hold such titles with the festival, effective with the summer 2020 season.
- 6 February
  - Opera Theatre of Saint Louis announces a bequest of $45M USD from Phyllis Brissenden, the single largest gift to the company in its history.
  - The Oregon Symphony announces that Carlos Kalmar is to conclude his tenure as its music director at the close of the 2020–2021 season.
- 10 February – The Staatsoper Hannover announces the appointment of Stephan Zilias as its next Generalmusikdirektor, effective with the 2020–2021 season.
- 11 February
  - Following protests from artists and audiences, and criticism from Prime Minister Jacinda Ardern, Radio New Zealand withdraws its earlier proposal to downgrade its RNZ Concert classical music service to an automated AM/streaming channel, and to retain RNZ Concert on its FM frequencies.
  - The Polar Music Prize announces Anna Netrebko as one of its two Polar Music Prize Laureates for 2020.
- 12 February
  - The Staatstheater Giessen announces the appointment of Florian Ludwig as its interim Generalmusikdirektor, for a limited contract of two seasons, the 2020-2021 and 2021–2022 seasons.
  - The Two Moors Festival announces the appointment of Tamsin Waley-Cohen as its new artistic director for its 2020 festival.
  - The Grand Teton Music Festival announces the appointment of Simon Woods as its interim executive director, effective 24 February 2020.
- 14 February – The Louisville Orchestra announces the resignation of Robert Murray as its chief executive officer, effective 6 May 2020.
- 19 February – The Opéra de Rouen Normandie announces the appointment of Ben Glassberg as its next music director, effective with the 2020–2021 season, with an initial contract of 3 seasons.
- 23 February – The Teatro alla Scala announces suspension of performances with immediate effect, in the wake of the Coronavirus disease 2019 outbreak in Italy.
- 24 February – The Hallé announces Delyana Lazarova as the winner of the inaugural Siemens Hallé International Conductors Competition 2020.
- 25 February
  - The American Guild of Musical Artists (AGMA) announces confirmation of allegations by AGMA members of long-standing sexual misconduct by Plácido Domingo.
  - Opera Theatre of Saint Louis announces the appointment of Walter Huff as its next chorus director.
- 26 February
  - José Manuel Rodríguez Uribes, the Spanish minister of culture, rescinds an invitation to Plácido Domingo to perform at the Teatro de la Zarzuela in May 2020, following the American Guild of Musical Artists report of confirmation of allegations of sexual misconduct against Domingo.
  - The Landestheater Coburg announces the appointment of Daniel Carter as its new Generalmusikdirektor, effective 1 February 2021.
  - The Baltimore Symphony Orchestra announces that Marin Alsop is to conclude her tenure as music director of the orchestra at the close of the 2020–2021 season.
- 27 February
  - The Hallé announces the appointment of David Butcher as its next chief executive, effective September 2020.
  - The Britten Sinfonia announces that David Butcher is to stand down as its chief executive and artistic director in the summer of 2020.
- 3 March – Washington National Opera announces the renaming of its young artist programme from the Domingo-Cafritz Young Artist Program to the Cafritz Young Artists of Washington National Opera.
- 4 March – San Francisco Opera announces that Sheri Greenawald is to retire as director of the San Francisco Opera Center and artistic director of the Merola Opera Program at the close of 2020.
- 5 March
  - Brett Dean is reported as diagnosed with COVID-19 and quarantined in isolation at the Royal Adelaide Hospital, following his return from Taipei.
  - The National Concert Hall (NCH) in Taipei is closed with immediate effect until further notice, following the diagnosis of Brett Dean with COVID-19 after his performance at the NCH Taipei.
- 10 March
  - Klaus Lederer, Berlin Senator for Culture, announces the cancellation of all cultural events in Berlin of more than 500 people, in the wake of the COVID-19 pandemic.
  - Following the ban by the federal government of Austria on persons entering from Italy, in the wake of the COVID-19 pandemic, the Vienna State Opera announces cancellation of performances through 2 April 2020.
  - LA Opera announces that the allegations of sexual misconduct by Plácido Domingo during his association with LA Opera have been found to be credible.
- 11 March
  - In response to the ban on public performances with more than 500 people in attendance in Berlin in the wake of the COVID-19 pandemic, the Berlin Philharmonic Orchestra and the Staatsoper Unter den Linden announce cancellation of performances from 11 March 2020 through 19 April 2020.
  - The Philharmonia Orchestra announces the appointment of Alexander Van Ingen as its next chief executive, effective September 2020.
  - The Academy of Ancient Music announces that Alexander Van Ingen is to stand down as its chief executive, effective September 2020.
  - Following a ban by San Francisco mayor London Breed on public events of more than 1000 people in the wake of the COVID-19 pandemic, the San Francisco Symphony announces cancellation of all concerts through 25 March 2020.
- 12 March – The following arts and classical music organisations announce suspension of performances in the wake of the COVID-19 pandemic:
  - Het Concertgebouw, through 31 March 2020
  - Seattle Symphony, through 31 March 2020
  - Metropolitan Opera, through 31 March 2020
  - New York Philharmonic, through 31 March 2020
  - Carnegie Hall, through 31 March 2020
  - Vancouver Symphony Orchestra, through 5 April 2020
  - Los Angeles Philharmonic, through 31 March 2020
- 13 March
  - French president Emmanuel Macron and Prime Minister Édouard Philippe announce a ban on public events of more than 100 persons, in the wake of the COVID-19 pandemic. The following French music organisations subsequently cancel performances:
    - Maison de la Radio
    - Théâtre des Champs-Elysées, through 19 April 2020
    - Théâtre du Châtelet
    - Opéra national du Rhin
    - Opéra de Bordeaux
    - Opéra de Nancy
    - Opéra de Rennes
  - The following US classical music organisations announce suspension of performances in the wake of the COVID-19 pandemic:
    - Boston Symphony Orchestra, through 28 March 2020
    - Chicago Symphony Orchestra, through 12 April 2020
  - The City of Birmingham Symphony Orchestra (CBSO) announces that CBSO music director Mirga Gražinytė-Tyla has tested positive for COVID-19, and is in self-quarantine.
- 17 March – The following UK classical music organisations announce suspension of performances in the wake of the COVID-19 pandemic:
  - All BBC Orchestras and Choirs
  - Bournemouth Symphony Orchestra
  - Southbank Centre, encompassing the London Philharmonic Orchestra and the Philharmonia Orchestra
  - London Symphony Orchestra
  - Royal Liverpool Philharmonic Orchestra, through 19 April 2020
- 16 March – At the Bavarian State Opera, Igor Levit, Christian Gerhaher, Christina Landshamer, Gerold Huber and musicians of the Bavarian State Orchestra give a concert to an empty theatre, streamed on-line, in the wake of the COVID-19 pandemic.
- 18 March
  - The Queen Elisabeth Piano Competition announces cancellation of its scheduled 2020 competition, in the wake of the COVID-19 pandemic.
  - The Cliburn announces postponement of the 2020 Cliburn International Amateur Piano Competition to 2022.
- 19 March – The Metropolitan Opera announces the cancellation of the remainder of its 2019–2020 season, because of the COVID-19 pandemic.
- 22 March – Plácido Domingo announces that he has tested positive for COVID-19.
- 23 March
  - Hazard Chase announces cessation of activity and entry into voluntary liquidation, in the wake of the COVID-19 pandemic.
  - The New York Philharmonic announces cancellation of the remainder of its 2019–2020 season, in the wake of the COVID-19 pandemic.
  - The Bavarian State Opera begins the first of a regular series of Monday concerts (Montagskonzerten), streamed from the empty theatre of the Bavarian State Opera and performed under social distancing guidelines, in the wake of the COVID-19 pandemic.
- 24 March – The following festivals announce cancellation of their 2020 seasons, in the wake of the COVID-19 pandemic:
  - St Magnus International Festival
  - Spoleto Festival USA (the first season cancellation in the festival's history)
  - Ojai Festival (the first season cancellation in the festival's history)
- 25 March – The Menuhin Competition announces the postponement of its scheduled Menuhin Competition Richmond 2020 to May 2021, with all 2020 entrants allowed to compete in 2021, in the wake of the COVID-19 pandemic.
- 26 March
  - The East Neuk Festival and the Verbier Festival each announce cancellation of their respective 2020 festival seasons, in the wake of the COVID-19 pandemic.
  - Anne-Sophie Mutter announces that she has tested positive for COVID-19 and is in self-quarantine.
  - The University of Michigan Board of Regents terminates David Daniels from its music faculty, after accusations of sexual misconduct against Daniels.
- 27 March
  - The first live-streamed concert of the Melbourne Digital Concert Hall takes place at the Athenaeum Theatre, performed by Arcadia Winds.
  - The Canadian Opera Company announces cancellation of the remainder of its 2019–2020 season, in the wake of the COVID-19 pandemic.
  - The Vancouver Symphony Orchestra announces cancellation of all concerts through 6 June 2020, and plans to lay off its musicians and a portion of its staff on 12 April 2020, and a 50% reduction in pay to senior management, in the wake of the COVID-19 pandemic.
  - The John F. Kennedy Center for the Performing Arts announces the furlough of the musicians and librarians of the National Symphony Orchestra, in the wake of the COVID-19 pandemic, and shortly after announcement of separate $25M (USD) funding for the Kennedy Center.
- 28 March – The Cabrillo Festival of Contemporary Music announces the cancellation of its 2020 festival season, in the wake of the COVID-19 pandemic.
- 30 March – The Aldeburgh Festival announces the cancellation of its 2020 festival season, in the wake of the COVID-19 pandemic, the first-ever festival cancellation in the festival's history.
- 31 March
  - The Bayreuth Festival announces the cancellation of its 2020 festival season, in the wake of the COVID-19 pandemic.
  - The Philharmonia Orchestra formally restructures its governance model, with the merger of Philharmonia Ltd and the Philharmonia Trust into a single organisation.
- 1 April
  - The Edinburgh International Festival announces the cancellation of its 2020 festival season, in the wake of the COVID-19 pandemic.
  - The Aspen Music Festival announces a delay in the scheduled start of its 2020 festival season to 16 July 2020, with cancellation of concerts in the originally scheduled first two weeks of the season, in the wake of the COVID-19 pandemic.
- 2 April
  - The Dartington Music Summer School and Festival announces the cancellation of its summer season, in the wake of the COVID-19 pandemic.
  - The following arts organisations announce the cancellation of the remainder of their 2019–2020 seasons, in the wake of the COVID-19 pandemic:
    - Carnegie Hall
    - Lyric Opera of Chicago
- 3 April
  - The League of American Orchestras announces the appointment of Simon Woods as its next chief executive.
  - Zachary Lewis, the classical music critic of the Cleveland Plain Dealer, is made redundant from his post, along with 21 other Plain Dealer staff.
  - Vancouver Opera announces the appointment of Tom Wright as its new general director.
- 5 April – The Odense Symphony Orchestra announces the appointment of Pierre Bleuse as its next chief conductor, effective with the 2021–2022 season, with an initial contract of 3 seasons.
- 6 April
  - The Salzburg Festival announces the cancellation of the Salzburg Whitsun Festival 2020, in the wake of the COVID-19 pandemic.
  - Following arbitration by Richard Bloch, the New York Philharmonic is ordered to reinstate Liang Wang and Matthew Muckey as members of the orchestra, after Bloch's determination that the orchestra had dismissed Wang and Muckey in September 2018 on charges of sexual misconduct, without just cause.
- 7 April
  - The Cheltenham Festival announces the cancellation of its 2020 season, in the wake of the COVID-19 pandemic.
  - The John F. Kennedy Center for the Performing Arts announces a reversal of its intended furlough of the musicians of the National Symphony Orchestra, following negotiations, which substitutes a wage cut through September 2020 in place of the musician furloughs.
  - Opera Theatre of Saint Louis announces the cancellation of its 2020 season, in the wake of the COVID-19 pandemic.
  - The Richmond Symphony Orchestra announces the appointment of Valentina Pileggi as its next music director, the first female conductor ever named to the post, effective 1 July 2020, with an initial contract of 4 years.
- 9 April – The following organisations announce cancellation of their scheduled 2020 summer seasons in the wake of the COVID-19 pandemic:
  - Lincoln Center for Performing Arts – 2020 Mostly Mozart Festival
  - Opera Saratoga
- 13 April – The board of directors of the Melbourne Symphony Orchestra announces a stand-down of the orchestra musicians and 12 administrative staff members, in the wake of the COVID-19 pandemic.
- 14 April
  - Scottish Awards for New Music:
    - Large Scale New Work (11+ performers) - Stuart MacRae: Anthropocene
    - The Royal Conservatoire of Scotland Award for Contribution to New Music in Scotland - Drake Music Scotland
    - Scottish New Music Performer(s) of the Year - Scottish Ensemble
    - Environmental Sustainability - Nevis Ensemble
    - The RCS Award for Making it Happen - Ben Lunn: Diversions
    - The ISM prize for Collaboration - Diversions: Ben Lunn, Drake Music Scotland, Hebrides Ensemble and Queen's Hall Edinburgh
    - The Dorico Award for Small / Medium Scale New Work (1 - 10 performers) - Martin Suckling: The Tuning
    - Electroacoustic/Sound Artwork - Edwin Hillier: Dhātu
    - Community/Education project (joint winners) - Tinderbox Collective and SCO Soundmoves
    - The Good Spirits Co Award for Innovation in New Traditional Music - Aidan O'Rourke and Kit Downes: 365
    - Recorded New Work - Chamber Music and Songs by Judith Weir: Airs from Another Planet - Hebrides Ensemble (Delphian Records)
    - The SMIA Award for Creative Programming - Matthew Whiteside: The Night With...
  - The University of Cincinnati College-Conservatory of Music announces the appointment of Joe Miller as its next director of choral studies, effective 15 August 2020. In parallel, Miller is to vacate his current directorship of the Westminster Choir.
  - San Francisco Opera announces the cancellation of its 2020 summer season, in the wake of the COVID-19 pandemic.
- 15 April – The following music organisations announce cancellations in the wake of the COVID-19 pandemic:
  - Chorégies d'Orange: cancellation of its 2020 festival season
  - Cincinnati Opera: cancellation of its 2020 summer festival season
- 24 April – The Akademie der Wissenschaften und der Literatur in Mainz announces Olga Neuwirth as the recipient of the 2020 Robert Schumann-Preis für Dichtung und Musik (Robert Schumann Prize for Poetry and Music).
- 27 April – The Bayreuth Festival announces that Katharina Wagner is to stand down from her leadership posts with the Festival 'until further notice' ("bis auf weiteres"), because of ill health.
- 29 April
  - The Janáček Philharmonic Orchestra announces the appointment of Vassily Sinaisky as its next chief conductor, effective with the 2020–2021 season.
  - The following organisations announce cancellation of their respective concert series, in the wake of the COVID-19 pandemic:
    - Lucerne Festival: cancellation of its 2020 summer festival season
    - San Francisco Symphony: cancellation of its remaining 2019–2020 season and summer 2020 concerts
- 1 May
  - The Berlin Philharmonic Orchestra presents its annual Europakonzert for the first time at the Berliner Philharmonie, to an empty hall, with a reduced contingent of musicians, soprano Christiane Karg, and conductor Kirill Petrenko, under social distancing guidelines, in the wake of the COVID-19 pandemic.
  - The following music organisations announce the cancellation of planned festival seasons, in the wake of the COVID-19 pandemic:
    - Ravinia Festival
    - Colorado Music Festival
- 4 May – The following US music festivals announce the cancellation of their respective 2020 festival seasons, in the wake of the COVID-19 pandemic:
  - Aspen Music Festival and School
  - Grant Park Music Festival
- 5 May
  - The Metropolitan Opera announces furloughs of 41 of its staff and reduction to part-time status of 11 other staff members, in the wake of the COVID-19 pandemic.
  - Glyndebourne Opera announces cancellation of its 2020 summer season, in the wake of the COVID-19 pandemic.
- 6 May – Britten Sinfonia announces the appointment of Meurig Bowen as its next chief executive and artistic director, effective August 2020.
- 7 May
  - Help Musicians UK announces the appointment of Dame Evelyn Glennie as its new president.
  - Following consultation with seven Berlin orchestras, the Berlin Charité publishes proposed guidelines for resuming orchestral concerts under social distancing and health safety guidelines in the context of the COVID-19 pandemic.
- 11 May – The following US music festivals announce the cancellation of their respective 2020 festival seasons, in the wake of the COVID-19 pandemic:
  - Santa Fe Opera
  - Santa Fe Chamber Music Festival
- 12 May
  - The New Zealand Symphony Orchestra announces the appointment of Peter Biggs as its new chief executive.
  - Wigmore Hall and BBC Radio 3 announce a scheduled series of live concerts from Wigmore Hall, beginning on 1 June, to be performed to an empty hall and under social distancing guidelines, the first live concerts from the hall and broadcast on Radio 3 since the general COVID-19 lockdown.
- 13 May – The following music organisations announce the cancellation of their 2020 festival seasons, in the wake of the COVID-19 pandemic:
  - Riga Jurmula Music Festival
  - Grand Teton Music Festival
- 15 May
  - Ulrike Lunacek resigns as Austrian minister of culture, following criticism of her actions with respect to the Austrian cultural economy in the wake of the COVID-19 pandemic.
  - The Rheingau Musik Festival announces the West-Eastern Divan Orchestra and Daniel Barenboim as the recipients of the 2020 Rheingau Musik Preis.
  - The Boston Symphony Orchestra announces the cancellation of its 2020 Tanglewood summer festival season, in the wake of the COVID-19 pandemic.
- 18 May
  - The government of Italy issues formal guidelines for the phased reopening of public performing arts events under social distancing guidelines, including limits of 200 audience members for indoor events and 1000 audience members for outdoor events.
  - At the Staatstheater Wiesbaden, under social distancing guidelines, Günther Groissböck and Alexandra Goloubitskaia perform the first live recital to a local live audience since the COVID-19-imposed lockdown.
- 20 May – The Lahti Symphony Orchestra simultaneously announces that Dima Slobodeniouk is to conclude his chief conductorship of the orchestra at the end of the 2020–2021 season, and the appointment of Dalia Stasevska as its next chief conductor, effective with the 2021–2022 season, with an initial contract of 3 seasons. Stasevka is the first female conductor to be named chief conductor of the orchestra.
- 22 May – The Ravenna Festival announces the scheduled launch of its revised 2020 summer festival season to begin on 21 June 2020, under newly issued social distancing guidelines in the wake of the COVID-19 pandemic.
- 25 May – The government of Austria announces its newest plans, in the wake of the COVID-19 pandemic, to allow public performing arts events to resume on 29 May 2020, under social distancing guidelines, with a maximum of 100 audience members and a suggested distance between patrons of 1 m.
- 26 May – The Orchestre de Chambre de Lausanne announces the appointment of Renaud Capuçon as its next artistic director, effective with the 2021–2022 season.
- 29 May – Lincoln Center for the Performing Arts announces that Jane Moss is to stand down as its artistic director in August 2020.
- 30 May – Over a period of 15.5 hours, Igor Levit gives a solo performance of Vexations by Erik Satie, from Berlin.
- 1 June
  - The Metropolitan Opera announces cancellation of scheduled performances in the first part of its originally scheduled 2020–2021 season, through 30 December 2019, in the wake of the COVID-19 pandemic.
  - At Wigmore Hall, Stephen Hough gives a live concert without an audience in attendance, video-streamed and broadcast on BBC Radio 3, the first live classical music concert in London and the first live music relay on BBC Radio 3 in 11 weeks since the imposition of COVID-19-related lockdown conditions.
  - Kim Varian becomes executive director of the Hamilton Philharmonic Orchestra, having previously served as interim executive director of the orchestra.
- 3 June – The Royal Concertgebouw Orchestra gives its first live performance since the imposition of lockdown conditions in The Netherlands in the wake of the COVID-19 pandemic, under social distancing conditions, conducted by Gustavo Gimeno.
- 4 June – Dallas Opera announces postponement and programming reduction of its originally scheduled 2020–2021 season, along with staff redundancies and furloughs, in the wake of the COVID-19 pandemic.
- 5 June
  - The Vienna Philharmonic Orchestra performs its first live concert at the Musikverein in Vienna since the imposition of lockdown conditions in the wake of the COVID-19 pandemic, to a limited audience, with Daniel Barenboim as piano soloist and conductor.
  - The Konzert Theater Bern announces the appointment of Nicholas Carter as its next Operndirektor (director of opera), effective in the summer of 2021.
  - Seattle Opera announces the cancellation of the first production of its originally scheduled 2020–2021 season and staff furloughs, in the wake of the COVID-19 pandemic.
- 8 June – The Bozeman Symphony announces the appointment of Norman Huyhn as its next music director.
- 9 June
  - The Norddeutschen Philharmonie Rostock announces the appointment of Marcus Bosch as its next chief conductor, effective with the 2020–2021 season.
  - The Royal Liverpool Philharmonic Orchestra announces the appointment of Domingo Hindoyan as its next chief conductor, effective with the 2021–2022 season.
  - The Salzburg Festival announces its revised summer 2020 programme, abridged in the wake of the COVID-19 pandemic, to be given under social distancing conditions.
- 10 June
  - The Innsbruck Festival of Early Music (Innsbrucker Festwochen der Alten Musik) announces a revised and abridged summer 2020 festival programme, in the wake of the COVID-19 pandemic.
  - The New York Philharmonic announces the cancellation of the first part of its scheduled 2020–2021 season, through 5 January 2021, in the wake of the COVID-19 pandemic.
- 11 June
  - In an interview with Le Monde, Stéphane Lissner announces his intention to vacate the general directorship of the Opéra de Paris at the end of 2020, ahead of his originally scheduled summer 2021 departure.
  - Lincoln Center for the Performing Arts announces the cancellation of the first part of its scheduled 2020–2021 season, through 5 January 2021, in the wake of the COVID-19 pandemic.
- 12 June – The Nashville Symphony Orchestra announces the suspension of its concert activities through 31 July 2021, and the scheduled furlough of 79 musicians, 49 staff members, and music director Giancarlo Guerrero on 1 July 2020.
- 13 June
  - The Hong Kong Philharmonic announces that Jaap van Zweden is to conclude his music directorship of the orchestra at the close of the 2023–2024 season.
  - The French music business store Wolf Musique ceases operations and closes its doors in Strasbourg, after 195 years of operation.
- 15 June – Birmingham Opera Company announces the appointment of Alpesh Chauhan as its new music director, effective 1 July 2020.
- 16 June
  - The following arts organisations announce cancellations of their scheduled autumn 2020 seasons, in the wake of the COVID-19 pandemic:
    - Lyric Opera of Chicago
    - San Francisco Opera
  - Universal Music Group announces the re-branding of its Virgin EMI label as EMI Records, and the appointment of Rebecca Allen as president of the EMI Records label.
  - The Philadelphia Orchestra announces the appointment of Nicole Jordan as its new principal librarian, the first African-American musician named as a full-time member of the organisation in its history.
- 18 June
  - The Orchestre de Paris announces the appointment of Klaus Mäkelä as its next music director, effective with the 2022–2023 season, with an initial contract of 5 seasons.
  - The Deutsches Nationaltheater and Staatskapelle Weimar announces the appointment of Dominik Beykirch as its new chief conductor, effective with the 2020–2021 season.
  - The following arts organisations announce cancellations of their scheduled autumn 2020 seasons, in the wake of the COVID-19 pandemic:
    - Carnegie Hall
    - Lincoln Center for the Performing Arts
    - San Francisco Symphony
  - The Music Critics Association of North America (MCANA) announces its 2020 Award for Best New Opera to Blue, by composer Jeanine Tesori and librettist Tazewell Thompson.
- 22 June – Canadian Opera Company announces the cancellation of its scheduled autumn 2020 performances through the end of 2020, in the wake of the COVID-19 pandemic.
- 23 June
  - The John F. Kennedy Center for the Performing Arts announces the cancellation of the scheduled autumn performances of the National Symphony Orchestra and Washington National Opera through the end of 2020, in the wake of the COVID-19 pandemic.
  - Houston Grand Opera announces cancellation of performances in its scheduled 2020–2021 season through February 2021, along with staff redundancies and salary reductions for remaining staff, in the wake of the COVID-19 pandemic.
- 24 June
  - The Omaha Symphony Orchestra announces the appointment of Ankush Kumar Bahl as its next music director, effective with the 2021–2022 season.
  - Utah Symphony | Utah Opera announces the appointment of Steven Brosvik as its next president and chief executive officer, effective August 17, 2020.
- 25 June
  - The following music organisations announce postponement of their originally scheduled autumn 2020 performances, through the end of 2020, in the wake of the COVID-19 pandemic.
    - Calgary Opera
    - Calgary Symphony
  - The London Philharmonic Orchestra announces the appointment of Cristina Rocca as its new artistic director, effective November 2020.
- 26 June
  - The city of Bochum announces the appointment of Tung-Chieh Chuang as the next Generalmusikdirektor of the Bochum Symphony, effective with the 2021–2022 season, with an initial contract of 3 years.
  - Columbia University announces Steven Schick as the recipient of the 2020 Ditson Conductor's Award.
- 27 June – The Vermont Symphony Orchestra announces the appointment of Elise Brunelle as its new executive director.
- 28 June – Frédéric Lodéon hosts the France Musique radio programme Carrefour de Lodéon for the final time, prior to his retirement.
- 1 July – The Teatro Real Madrid gives a live staged performance of La traviata, under social distancing conditions, the first opera performance in Spain since the imposition of lockdown conditions in the wake of the COVID-19 pandemic.
- 2 July – Opera North announces postponement of its originally scheduled autumn 2020 and winter 2021 productions, in the wake of the COVID-19 pandemic.
- 3 July
  - The city of Wuppertal announces the appointment of Patrick Hahn as its next Generalmusikdirektor (GMD), to encompass both the Wuppertaler Bühnen und Sinfonieorchester GmbH, effective with the 2021–2022 season.
  - The BBC Proms announces its reconfigured 2020 Proms season, with 6 weeks of archival Proms and selected new digital content, and the final 2 weeks of the season scheduled to feature live concerts under social distancing guidelines at the Royal Albert Hall.
  - Dutch National Opera & Ballet announces that general director Els van der Plas is to leave the company on 1 November 2020, to take a new post at the Bonnefanten Museum in Maastricht.
- 4 July – The Bamberg Symphony announces the prize winners of its 2020 Mahler Competition for conductors:
  - First Prize: Finnegan Downie Dear
  - Second Prize: Thomas Jung
  - Third Prize: Wilson Ng, Harry Ogg, Katharina Wincor
- 5 July – The UK government announces plans for a £1.57 billion relief package for arts and heritage sectors.
- 6 July
  - The government of France announces the nomination of Roselyne Bachelot as its next minister of culture.
  - The Toronto Symphony Orchestra announces the cancellation of its originally scheduled 2020-2021 concert season, with plans to be announced for replacement concerts on a smaller scale in various Toronto venues, in the wake of the COVID-19 pandemic.
- 7 July
  - The MacDowell Colony announces its renaming to MacDowell.
  - The Philharmonia Baroque Orchestra & Chorale announces the cancellation of its originally scheduled 2020–2021 season concerts through December 2020, with plans to be announced for a replacement '2020/VIRTUAL' series, in the wake of the COVID-19 pandemic.
  - The Kauffman Center for the Performing Arts announces the cancellation of its originally scheduled 2020–2021 season concerts through January 2021, which impacts the Kansas City Ballet, Kansas City Symphony, Lyric Opera of Kansas City, and the Harriman-Jewell Series, in the wake of the COVID-19 pandemic.
- 8 July
  - The Orchester Musikkollegium Winterthur announces the appointment of Roberto González-Monjas as its next music director, effective with the 2021–2022 season, with an initial contract of 4 seasons.
  - Cadogan Hall presents a live concert by the English Chamber Orchestra (ECO) under social distancing guidelines, the first live concert at Cadogan Hall and the first live ECO performance since the imposition of lockdown conditions in the wake of the COVID-19 pandemic.
  - The Charlotte Symphony Orchestra announces the appointment of David Fisk as its next president and chief executive officer, effective 31 August 2020.
  - The Oregon Symphony announces the cancellation of its originally scheduled 2020–2021 season concerts through December 2020, in the wake of the COVID-19 pandemic.
- 9 July – New Orleans Opera announces the appointment of Clare Burovac as its next general director, effective 15 September 2020.
- 10 July – The Ravinia Festival announces the appointment of Jeffrey Haydon as its next president and chief executive officer.
- 16 July
  - The Orchestre philharmonique de Strasbourg announces the appointment of Aziz Shokhakimov as its next music director, effective with the 2021–2022 season, with an initial contract of 3 seasons.
  - The following USA music organisations have announced cancellation of events through December 2020, in the wake of the COVID-19 pandemic:
    - New Jersey Symphony Orchestra
    - Chicago Symphony Orchestra
    - Los Angeles Philharmonic
- 18 July – A fire at Nantes Cathedral destroys the cathedral organ.
- 20 July – The Richard Tucker Music Foundation removes David N. Tucker from its board of directors, following his posting of racialist comments on Facebook.
- 27 July – The Cincinnati Symphony Orchestra announces the cancellation of its originally scheduled 2020–2021 season concerts through 3 January 2021, in the wake of the COVID-19 pandemic.
- 28 July
  - The Grand Teton Music Festival announces the appointment of Emma Kail as its next executive director, effective 1 September 2020.
  - LA Opera announces postponement of its originally scheduled autumn 2020 productions and rescheduling of them to the 2021–2022 season, in the wake of the COVID-19 pandemic.
- 30 July
  - The Boston Symphony Orchestra announces cancellation of its scheduled subscription concerts through November 2020, the first-ever full cancellation of the orchestra's autumn subscription concerts in its history, in the wake of the COVID-19 pandemic.
  - The Kansas City Symphony announces a new contract agreement, as an amendment to the current contract through the 2023–2024 season with the orchestra musicians, that includes a 19% reduction in musician salaries for the 2020–2021 season, in the wake of the COVID-19 pandemic.
- 31 July – San Francisco Opera announces the appointments of Carrie-Ann Matheson and of Markus Beam respectively as artistic director and general manager of its San Francisco Opera Center.
- 1 August – The opening night of the Salzburg Festival takes place, under social distancing guidelines, including a staged production of Richard Strauss' Elektra with a limited audience present.
- 2 August – The Salzburg Festival presents the first night of its new production of Così fan tutte, in an abridged version without an interval, conducted by Joana Mallwitz, the third female conductor to conduct an opera production at the Salzburg Festival, and the first female conductor directly scheduled in advance by the Salzburg Festival for an opera production.
- 4 August – The Dallas Opera announces the posthumous awarding of its 2020 Maria Callas Award to Terrence McNally.
- 5 August – Fort Worth Opera announces the cancellation of the 2020 McCammon Voice Competition, in the wake of the COVID-19 pandemic, and the awarding of US$300 to each of the competition semi-finalists.
- 7 August – The Curtis Institute of Music announces the appointment of the Dover Quartet as the newly established Penelope P. Watkins Ensemble-in-Residence, effective 31 August 2020.
- 8 August
  - The Boston Symphony Orchestra announces cancellation of its scheduled subscription concerts through November 2020, the first-ever full cancellation of the orchestra's autumn subscription concerts in its history, in the wake of the COVID-19 pandemic.
  - The Kansas City Symphony announces a new contract agreement, as an amendment to the current contract through the 2023–2024 season with the orchestra musicians, that includes a 19% reduction in musician salaries for the 2020–2021 season, in the wake of the COVID-19 pandemic.
- 10 August – Manhattan School of Music announces the appointment of Tazewell Thompson as its new director of opera studies, with immediate effect.
- 12 August – Glyndebourne Opera stages the first night of its new live production of Jacques Offenbach's Mesdames de la Halle, in English translation under the title In the Market for Love, or Onions are Forever, under social distancing conditions for the musicians and audience, in the wake of the COVID-19 pandemic.
- 17 August
  - Wigmore Hall announces a schedule for 100 autumn season concerts under social distancing conditions, scheduled for the period of 13 September 2020 to 22 December 2020.
  - The Harris Theater, Chicago announces the appointment of Lori Dimum as its new president and chief executive officer, with immediate effect.
  - The Phoenix Symphony announces the cancellation of its 2020-2021 concert season, the first US orchestra to cancel its planned 2020–2021 season in its entirety, in the wake of the COVID-19 pandemic.
- 21 August – Opera Australia announces plans to sell its warehouse in Alexandria, in the wake of the COVID-19 pandemic.
- 28 August
  - Imogen Cooper is announced as the recipient of The Queens Medal for Music 2019.
  - The Théâtre du Châtelet announces the departure of Ruth Mackenzie as its artistic director, with immediate effect.
  - The first live concert of the 2020 BBC Proms takes place at the Royal Albert Hall, featuring the BBC Symphony Orchestra and the BBC Singers conducted by Sakari Oramo, under social distancing conditions for the musicians, without an audience and to an empty hall.
- 31 August – Columbia Artists Management Inc. ceases operations after 90 years.
- 1 September
  - Cristian Măcelaru becomes music director of the Orchestre National de France, one year earlier than originally scheduled.
  - Alexander Neef becomes general director of the Opéra de Paris, ahead of his originally scheduled 2021 advent to the post, and Stéphane Lissner formally stands down from the same post.
- 5 September – At the Sankt Burchardi Kirche (St. Burchardi Church), Halberstadt, the newest chord change in the planned 639-year performance of John Cage's Organ2/ASLSP (As Slow as Possible) takes place, the first chord change since October 2013.
- 9 September
  - Michigan Opera Theatre announces the appointment of Yuval Sharon as its new artistic director, with an initial contract of 5 years.
  - Virginia Opera announces the appointment of Peggy Kriha Dye as its new general director and chief executive officer, effective 18 October 2020.
- 10 September – The Dallas Symphony Orchestra performs its 2020–2021 season opening concert under the direction of music director Fabio Luisi, under social distancing conditions with a reduced orchestra and a limited audience in attendance, the first US orchestra to perform its opening concert to a live audience with its music director since the start of the COVID-19 pandemic.
- 15 September
  - Corinna Niemeyer becomes artistic director and music director of the Orchestre de Chambre du Luxembourg (OCL), the first female conductor ever to hold these posts with the OCL, with an initial contract of 4 years.
  - The Avery Fisher Artist Program announces Anthony McGill as the recipient of the 2020 Avery Fisher Prize.
- 16 September - The Royal Philharmonic Society awards honorary membership to Dame Sarah Connolly, at a live Wigmore Hall recital.
- 17 September
  - Anna Netrebko announces via Instagram that she has tested positive for SARS-CoV-2.
  - The Erzgebirgischen Theater- und Orchester GmbH announces that Naoshi Takahashi is to conclude his tenure as its Generalmusikdirektor (GMD), in March 2021.
- 20 September – At the Teatro Real Madrid, during a performance of Un ballo in maschera, audience protests in the mezzanine section at the close proximity of the patrons in that section cause the performance to be abandoned.
- 21 September – Katharina Wagner resumes work at the Bayreuth Festival, following her recovery from illness earlier in the year.
- 22 September – The Curtis Institute of Music releases the full report of investigations into past allegations of sexual misconduct by Curtis faculty, including by Jascha Brodsky against Lara St. John.
- 23 September – The Metropolitan Opera announces the cancellation of its planned 2020-2021 mainstage season, in the wake of the COVID-19 pandemic.
- 24 September – The Spoleto Festival USA announces that Nigel Redden is to retire as its general director in October 2021.
- 25 September – Opera Australia makes redundant 16 of its orchestra musicians.
- 29 September – The American Guild of Musical Artists (AGMA) formally endorses Joseph Biden and Kamala Harris for president and vice-president, respectively, of the US, the first such endorsement in AGMA's history.
- 6 October
  - The Vienna Volksoper announces the appointment of Lotte de Beer as its next artistic director, the first woman ever named to the post, effective 1 September 2022, with an initial contract of 5 years.
  - 400 professional UK musicians stage a socially distanced performance protest in support of musicians not covered by the Self-Employment Income Support Scheme (SEISS) grant.
  - The Canadian Opera Company announces the cancellation of its remaining spring 2021 mainstage productions, in the wake of the COVID-19 pandemic.
- 8 October – Calgary Opera announces the resignation of Bramwell Tovey as its artistic director.
- 9 October – Queen's Birthday Honours List 2020
  - Donald Runnicles is made a Knight Bachelor.
  - John Mark Ainsley, Sally Beamish, Nicholas Daniel, Cathyrn Graham and Jan Latham-Koenig are each made an Officer of the Order of the British Empire.
  - Stephen Layton and Jennifer Pike are each made a Member of the Order of the British Empire.
- 12 October – The Utah Symphony announces a revision to the previously scheduled conclusion of the contract of Thierry Fischer as its music director, with a new one-year extension through August 2023, to supersede an earlier May 2019 announcement.
- 13 October – The New York Philharmonic announces the cancellation of its 2020–2021 season concerts through June 2021, in the wake of the COVID-19 pandemic, the first-ever cancellation of a full season in the orchestra's history.
- 16 October
  - The Orchestre de Picardie announces the appointment of Johanna Malangré as its next music director, the first female conductor ever named to the post, effective with the 2022–2023 season.
  - The Boston Symphony Orchestra announces the cancellation of the remainder of its 2020–2021 season, in the wake of the COVID-19 pandemic.
- 20 October
  - The San Francisco Conservatory of Music announces its acquisition of the Opus 3 Artists agency.
  - The Los Angeles Philharmonic announces the cancellation of the remainder of its 2020–2021 season, in the wake of the COVID-19 pandemic.
- 21 October
  - NI Opera announces the appointment of Cameron Menzies as its next artistic director.
  - Lyric Opera of Chicago announces the full cancellation of its planned 2020-2021 mainstage season, in the wake of the COVID-19 pandemic.
- 22 October – The Berklee College of Music announces the appointment of Erica Muhl as its next president, the first woman named to the post, effective July 2021.
- 25 October – The prime minister of Italy, Giuseppe Conte, announces the closure of all Italian theatres and concert halls through 24 November, in the wake of the COVID-19 pandemic.
- 26 October – The city of Liège orders the closure of its four main arts venues, l'Orchestre Philharmonique de Liège, l'Opéra Royal de Wallonie-Liège, le Forum, and le Théâtre de Liège through 19 November, in the wake of the COVID-19 pandemic.
- 27 October
  - The Taiwan Philharmonic announces the appointment of Jun Märkl as its next artistic advisor, effective August 2021.
  - The philharmonie zuidnederland announces the appointment of Duncan Ward as its chief conductor, effective with the 2021–2022 season, with an initial contract of 3 years.
- 29 October – Carnegie Hall announces the cancellation of its scheduled events through 5 April 2021, in the wake of the COVID-19 pandemic.
- 30 October – Chamber Music America announces that Margaret M. Lioi is to stand down as its chief executive officer in July 2021.
- 4 November
  - The Southbank Centre announces the appointment of Toks Dada as its new head of classical music, effective December 2020.
  - The WDR Funkhausorchester Köln announces the appointment of Frank Strobel as its next chief conductor, effective autumn 2021.
  - The Teatro alla Scala announces that its planned traditional 7 December opening night performance, of Lucia di Lammermoor under social distancing conditions, is cancelled to a public in-person audience in the wake of a resurgence of COVID-19 cases in Italy.
- 5 November – The Vienna Philharmonic Orchestra performs a live concert at Kitakyusyu Soleil Hall in Kitakyushu, Japan, the first orchestra to tour internationally since the outbreak of the COVID-19 pandemic.
- 9 November
  - The Brooklyn Academy of Music announces that its president, Katy Clark, is to stand down from the post in January 2021.
  - The San Francisco Symphony announces the cancellation of all of its 2020-2021 scheduled season concerts through 30 June 2021, in the wake of the COVID-19 pandemic.
- 17 November - The Baltimore Symphony Orchestra announces the appointment of James Conlon as its artistic advisor, effective with the 2021–2022 season.
- 18 November - The Academy of Ancient Music announces the appointment of Laurence Cummings as its next music director, effective with the 2021–2022 season.
- 20 November - Houston Grand Opera announces that Perryn Leech is to stand down as its managing director on 31 December 2020.
- 27 November – Christina Petrowska Quilico and Lara St. John are appointed, and Marietta Orlov is posthumously appointed, to the Order of Canada.
- 28 November - Estonian National Opera announces the appointment of Ott Maaten as its next general manager, effective 1 January 2021, with an initial contract of 3 years.
- 30 November
  - Royal Swedish Opera announces the appointment of Michael Cavanagh as its next artistic director, effective in the summer of 2021, with an initial contract of 5 years.
  - The Canadian Opera Company announces the appointment of Perryn Leech as its next general director, effective in the summer of 2021, with an initial contract of 5 years.
- 1 December - The La Jolla Music Society announces the appointment of Todd Schultz as its next president and chief executive officer, effective 4 January 2021.
- 3 December - The Stiftung Händel-Haus announces Andrea Marcon as the recipient of the 2021 Händel-Preis der Stadt.
- 7 December – Early Music Vancouver announces the appointment of Suzie LeBlanc as its next artistic director and executive director, the first woman ever named to the posts, effective 4 January 2021.
- 9 December
  - The Vienna Volksoper announces the appointment of Omer Meir Wellber as its next music director, effective 1 September 2022, with an initial contract of 5 years.
  - The Philadelphia Orchestra announces the appointment of Nathalie Stutzmann as its next principal guest conductor, the first female conductor ever named to the post, effective with the 2021–2022 season, with a contract of 3 years.
- 17 December – The Orquesta y Coro de la Comunidad de Madrid announces the appointment of Marzena Diakun as its next music, the first woman ever named to the post, effective with the 2021–2022 season, with an initial contract of 2 years.
- 18 December – The Choir of Kings College, Cambridge announces the cancellation of its scheduled live performance of the 2020 Festival of Nine Lessons and Carols. In its place on 24 December, a recording of the music made as an alternative event is to be relayed.
- 21 December
  - The Malaysian Philharmonic Orchestra announces the appointment of Jun Märkl as its next music director, effective with the 2021 season.
  - The girl choristers of Ely Cathedral perform the 'Hymn for Christmas Day' by Jane Savage, the earliest known Church of England anthem by a female composer, following its re-discovery in the summer of 2020 by Rachel Webber of the University of York.
  - Esa-Pekka Salonen is made an honorary KBE by Queen Elizabeth II, for services to music and to United Kingdom-Finland cultural relations.
- 23 December – SABAM announces Bram van Camp as the SABAM for Culture composer of the year, for his works Träume and Scherzo-Bagatelle.
- 30 December
  - Daniel Taylor is appointed to the Order of Canada.
  - 2021 New Year's Honours:
    - Jane Glover is made a Dame Commander of the British Empire.
    - Graham Vick is made a Knight Bachelor.
    - Julian Anderson, Barry Douglas, Daniel Harding, and Wasfi Kani are each made a Commander of the Order of the British Empire.
    - Natalie Clein and Wayne Marshall are each made an Officer of the Order of the British Empire.
    - Bradley Creswick is made a Member of the Order of the British Empire.

== New works ==
The following composers' works were composed, premiered, or published this year, as noted in the citation.

=== A ===
- Thomas Adès - Dawn
- Ambrose Akinmusire – the river has its destination
- Irini Amargianaki – Eumeniden
- Benjamin Attahir – Bayn Athnyn

=== B ===
- Nicolas Bacri – Ophelia's Tears
- Amanda Berlind – Bird Chart
- Lisa Bielawa – Sanctuary for violin and orchestra
- Johannes Boris Borowski – Sphinxes

=== C ===
- Ana Leira Carnero – Funeral Music for Pandemic's Fallen Heroes
- Michaela Catranis – Tyranny of noise: rapture of a sonic_colourbody for ensemble, electronics and AI agent
- Anne Cawrse – A Room of Her Own
- Enrico Chapela – Violin Concerto The work had been scheduled for premiere prior to the COVID-19 pandemic.
- Deborah Cheetham – Dutala, star filled sky
- Unsuk Chin – Spira – A Concerto for Orchestra
- Tom Coult – Pleasure Garden The work had been scheduled for premiere prior to the COVID-19 pandemic.
- Alvin Curran – Missteps

=== D ===
- Lawrence Dunn – We are all okay

=== F ===
- Anthony Fiumara - See the Sky About to Rain
- Luca Francesconi – Lichtschatten

=== G ===
- Bernhard Gander – OOZING EARTH
- Howard Goodall – Never to Forget
- Geoffrey Gordon - He saith among the trumpets
- Hildur Guðnadóttir – Illimani

=== H ===
- Iman Habibi – Jeder Baum spricht
- Adolphus Hailstork – St. Paul's Blues (for solo flute)
- Juliana Hall (music) and Caitlin Vincent (text) – Ahab
- Anders Hillborg – Through Lost Landscapes
- Dani Howard – Dualism
- York Höller – Beethoven Paraphrase The work had been scheduled for premiere prior to the COVID-19 pandemic.

=== I ===
- Clara Iannotta – You crawl over seas of granite
- Márton Illés – Vont-tér (for violin and orchestra)

=== J ===
- Michael Jarrell – Le point est la source de tout...
- Maya Miro Johnson – Manuscripts Don't Burn
- John Paul Jones – The Tudor Pull
- Thomas Hewitt Jones– Divertimento for String Quartet

=== K ===
- Christoph Kalz – A Spectator's Guide to the Orchestra (Symphonic Caricature for large orchestra)
- Gordon Kampe – Masque
- Hannah Kendall - Tuxedo: Vasco 'de' Gama
- Aaron Jay Kernis – Elegy — for those we lost
- Gordon Kerry – Clarinet Quintet
- Veronika Krausas – Master and Margarita (suite for speaking pianist)
- György Kurtág – ...concertante...
- Yu Kuwabara – Time Abyss

=== L ===
- Joan La Barbara – Ears of an Eagle; Eyes of a Hawk: In the Vortex
- Lori Laitman – The Imaginary Photo Album (texts by AE Stalliings, Eugene Field, and Joyce Sutphen)
- Tania León – Stride
- Liza Lim – Sex Magic

=== M ===
- Ella Macens – Superimposition
- Philippe Manoury – Soubresauts
- Cyrus Meurant – When I stand before thee at the day's end
- Eric Moe – Like Diamonds We Are Cut with Our Own Dust
- Nico Muhly - Throughline

=== N ===
- Qasim Naqvi – Featureless
- Sarah Nemtsov – Rezubs The work had been scheduled for premiere prior to the COVID-19 pandemic.
- Olga Neuwirth – coronAtion II: Naufraghi del mondo che hanno ancora un cuore. cinque isole della fatica
- Marko Nikodijević – abgesang

=== P ===
- Martijn Padding – Softly Bouncing
- Roxanna Panufnik – Heartfelt
- Robert Paterson – String Quartet No. 3
- Alex Paxton – ILolli-pop
- Matthias Pintscher – beyond II (bridge over troubled water)
- Julia Plaut – 24 Pianos
- Tanner Porter – The Sycamore
- Paola Prestini – Thrush Song (on Rachel Carson before Silent Spring)
- Kevin Puts – Aria (for cello and piano)

=== R ===
- Ellen Reid – When the World As You've Known It Doesn't Exist
- Emma-Ruth Richards – The Sail of a Flame
- Wolfgang Rihm – Concerto en sol (for Sol Gabetta)
- Christian Rivet – Terre d'Ombres
- Daniel Bernard Roumain- i am a white person who _____ Black people

=== S ===
- Igor Santos – portrait IO
- Josep Planells Schiaffino – Con sperzzatura The work had been scheduled for premiere prior to the COVID-19 pandemic.
- Elmer Schönberger – Gezien Hercules Segers
- Roberto Sierra – Salseando
- Carlos Simon – Fate Now Conquers
- Dimitrios Skyllas – Kyrie eleison
- Sarah Kirkland Snider – Forward Into Light The work had been scheduled for premiere prior to the COVID-19 pandemic.
- Tyshawn Sorey
  - For Marcos Balter
  - For Roscoe Mitchell
- Bent Sørensen – Enchantress (5 intermezzi for orchestra)
- Helge Sten – UTOPIAS
- Marco Stroppa – And One By One We Drop Away The work had been scheduled for premiere prior to the COVID-19 pandemic.

=== T ===
- Andrea Tarrodi - Solus
- Dave Taylor – Houdini's Lament
- Davóne Tines – VIGIL
- Mark-Anthony Turnage
  - Last Song for Olly
  - Towards Alba

=== V ===
- Patrick van Deurzen (music) and Jules Terlingen (text) – Sura Cantate
- Valery Voronov – Acqua Alta

=== W ===
- Sophie Westbrooke – Quiet Stream
- Jörg Widmann – empty space
- Ryan Wigglesworth – Five Waltzes
- Julia Wolfe – Flower Power

=== Y ===
- Lisa Young – Sacred Stepping Stones
- Nina C. Young – Tread softly

== New operas ==
- Matthew Aucoin and Sarah Ruhl – Eurydice
- Tom Coult and Alice Birch – Violet
- Jan-Peter de Graaff – Bonsai Garden
- Johanna Doderer and Peter Turrini – Schuberts Reisen nach Atzenbrugg
- Søren Nils Eichberg and John von Düffel – Wolf unter Wölfen
- Steven Mark Kohn – The Trial of Susan B. Anthony
- Willem Jeths and Frank Siera – Ritratto
- Josephine Macken – The Tent
- Rachel J. Peters and Royce Vavrek – The Wild Beast of the Bungalow
- Tobias Picker and Aryeh Lev Stollman – Awakenings (originally scheduled prior to the COVID-19 pandemic)
- Peggy Polias – Commute
- Huang Ruo and David Henry Hwang – M. Butterfly (originally scheduled prior to the COVID-19 pandemic)
- Georgia Scott and Pierce Wilcox – Her Dark Marauder
- Bree van Reyk – The Invisible Bird
- Alex Woolf and David Pountney – A Feast in the Time of Plague
- Luna Pearl Woolf and Royce Vavrek – Jacqueline

== Albums ==
- Vaughan Williams – Saraband – "Helen" (first recording) / A Pastoral Symphony / Symphony No 4 (Hyperion)
- Mario Castelnuovo-Tedesco – The Importance of Being Earnest (Odyssey Opera; first recording)
- Hans Abrahamsen – Left, Alone / Gérard Pesson – Future Is a Faded Song / Oscar Strasnoy – Kuleshov (Alexandre Tharaud, pianist)
- Rhian Samuel – Clytemnestra (first recording) / Mahler – Rückert-Lieder / Berg – Altenberg Lieder (BIS; Ruby Hughes / BBC NOW / Jac van Steen)
- Spark Catchers – Errollyn Wallen – Concerto Grosso / James Wilson – The Green Fuse / Hannah Kendall – The Spark Catchers / Daniel Kidane – Dream Song / Philip Herbert – Elegy / Julian Joseph – Carry That Sound (NMC; Chineke! Orchestra and Chorus)
- Rhian Samuel and Clara Schumann – Song Lied Cân
- Gounod – Faust (1858-1859 version)
- Nico Muhly / Philip Glass – Unexpected News (Brett Brown; Alexandra Osborne; Sally Whitwell; Omega Ensemble)
- Thomas Adès – Piano Concerto / Totentanz
- Liza Lim – Extinction Events and Dawn Chorus
- Carl Philipp Emanuel Bach – Kenner und Liebhaber (Peter Serkin, piano; his final recording)
- The Night With... Live Vol. One - Cinq Petites Entropies / Garth Knox - ReVerse 2 / Adam Porębski - Flow My Tears / John Dowland - ...shadows that in darkness dwell... / Timothy Cooper - to sleep on it / Ruari Paterson-Achenbach - Medieval Fantasy / Garth Knox - Oscillate / Linda Buckley - Solo for Viola d'amore and Electronics / Matthew Whiteside - Daily Rituals / Matthew Grouse - I Said / Nora Marazaite - In Nomine / William Byrd - In C / Terry Riley (TNW Music / Garth Knox / Hermes Experiment / Ensemble 1604 / Duo van Vliet)
- Sir James MacMillan – Symphony No. 5 (Le grand Inconnu) / The Sun Danced (first recordings)
- British Violin Sonatas, Volume 3 – William Alwyn: Sonatina / York Bowen: Sonata, op. 112 / James Francis Brown: The Hart's Grace (first recording) / Eric Coates: First Meeting / John Ireland: Sonata No. 2 (Tasmin Little, violin; Piers Lane, piano)
- Philip Glass – Music in Eight Parts (first recording)
- Cyrillus Kreek – The Suspended Harp of Babel
- Michael Daugherty – This Land Sings
- William Alwyn – Miss Julie (second commercial recording; Anna Patalong, Benedict Nelson, Rosie Aldridge, Samuel Sakker; BBC Symphony Orchestra; Sakari Oramo)
- "Singing in the Dead of Night" – David Lang: these broken wings; Michael Gordon: the light of the dark; Julia Wolfe: dead of night
- Naomi Pinnock – Lines and Spaces
- Dame Ethyl Smyth (music) and H.B. Brewster (text) – The Prison (first commercial recording)
- Douglas Weiland – String Quartets Nos 4 and 5 (first recordings)
- Ethyl Smyth - Fête Galante / Liza Lehmann – The Happy Prince
- Alexander Kastalsky – Requiem for Fallen Soldiers (first recording)
- Cat Hope / Erkki Veltheim – Works for Travelled Pianos (Gabriella Smart, piano)
- Osvaldo Golijov – Falling Out of Time (texts by David Grossman)
- Mariss Jansons - His Last Concert: Live at Carnegie Hall (Richard Strauss, Brahms)
- Vanitas: Wolfgang Rihm - Vermischter Traum (first recording) / Beethoven - An die ferne Geliebte / Schubert – selected lieder (Georg Nigl, Olga Pashchenko)
- John Tavener – No Longer Mourn for Me
- Mobili - Music for Viola and Piano from Chile (compositions by Rafael Díaz, Carlos Botto, Federico Heinlein, David Cortés, and Juan Orrego-Salas; first recordings)
- Tālivaldis Ķeniņš – Symphony No. 1 / Concerto di Camera / Concerto for Piano with String Orchestra and Percussion
- Cor de Groot – Piano (piano works by Cor de Groot, Jan Felderhof, Jaap Geraedts, Ton de Leeuw, Jurriaan Andriessen, Léon Orthel)
- Rick van Veldhuizen: unde imber et ignes
- Tõnu Kõrvits – You Are Light and Morning (texts by Cesare Pavese)
- Hans Werner Henze – Der Prinz von Homburg (first commercial recording)
- Franz Lehár – Cloclo (first complete recording)
- Mieczyslaw Weinberg – Wir gratulieren! (first recording)

== Deaths ==
- 1 January
  - Joan Benson, American clavichordist, 94
  - Jaap Schröder, Dutch violinist, conductor, pedagogue, and specialist in the historically informed performance movement, 94
- 4 January – Emanuel Borok, Russia-born, United States-resident orchestral violinist, pedagogue, and past concertmaster (leader) of the Dallas Symphony Orchestra, 75
- 7 January – Ana Lucrecia Taglioretti, Paraguayan violinist, 24
- 12 January – Giorgio Merighi, Italian tenor, 80
- 14 January
  - Guy Deplus, French clarinetist, 95
  - Naděžda Kniplová, Czech soprano, 87
- 16 January – Barry Tuckwell, Australia-born French horn player, conductor, and past principal French horn of the London Symphony Orchestra, 86
- 18 January – John Burke, Canadian composer, 68
- 21 January – Bernard Gabel, French orchestral trumpeter, 77
- 22 January – Valéry Ryvkin, Russia-born opera conductor, vocal coach, and pedagogue, 59
- 23 January – Franz Mazura, Austrian bass-baritone, 95
- 28 January – Othmar Mága, German conductor and composer, 90
- 29 January – Dwight Shambley, American orchestral double bassist, 70
- 30 January – Vidmantas Bartulis, Lithuanian composer, 65
- 1 February – Peter Serkin, American pianist, 72
- 3 February – Eric Parkin, British pianist, 95
- 4 February – Volker David Kirchner, German violist and composer, 77
- 5 February – Yves Pouliquen, French ophthalmologist and past president of the Singer-Polignac Foundation, 88
- 6 February – Nello Santi, Italian opera conductor, 88
- 9 February
  - Vladimir Kranjčević, Croatian conductor, 84
  - Mirella Freni, Italian soprano, 84
  - Sergei Slonimsky, Russian composer, 88
  - Margareta Hallin, Swedish soprano, 88
- 12 February
  - Hamish Milne, British pianist, 80
  - William Winstead, American orchestral bassoonist, pedagogue, and past principal bassoonist of the Cincinnati Symphony Orchestra, 77
- 13 February – Christophe Desjardins, French violist, 57
- 14 February – Reinbert de Leeuw, Dutch pianist, conductor, composer, and specialist in contemporary music, 81
- 16 February – Jaring Walta, Dutch orchestral violinist and past concertmaster (leader) of the Residentie Orkest, 78
- 25 February – Irina Bochkova, Russian violinist and pedagogue, 81
- 29 February
  - Odile Pierre, French organist, 89
  - William O. Smith, American composer and jazz clarinetist (as Bill Smith), 93
- 3 March
  - Patricia Barretto, American arts administrator, 45
  - Günther Müller, German conductor, musicologist and pedagogue, 95
- 6 March – Elinor Ross, American soprano, 88
- 8 March – Martin Davorin-Jagodić, Croatian composer of electronic music, 84
- 9 March – Anton Coppola, American conductor, composer, and founding artistic director of Tampa Opera, 102
- 11 March – Charles Wuorinen, American composer, 81
- 14 March – Doriot Anthony Dwyer, American orchestral flautist and the first female principal flute of the Boston Symphony Orchestra, 98
- 18 March
  - Jean Leber, French violinist, pedagogue and music administrator, 80 (from COVID-19)
  - Sir John Tooley, British arts administrator, 95
- 21 March – Hellmut Stern, German orchestral violinist and past concertmaster (leader) of the Berlin Philharmonic Orchestra, 91
- 22 March – Kenneth Wentworth, American classical music impresario and pedagogue, 92
- 24 March
  - Edward Tarr, American trumpeter and musicologist, 83
  - Gerard Schurmann, Dutch composer resident in the UK and the US, 96
  - Terrence McNally, American playwright and opera librettist, 81 (from COVID-19)
  - Anatoliy Mokrenko, Ukrainian baritone and opera house administrator, 89
- 25 March – Jennifer Bate, British organist, 75
- 26 March
  - André Larquié, French arts administrator, 81
  - Luigi Roni, Italian bass, 78 (from COVID-19)
- 27 March – Mirna Doris, Italian singer, 79
- 28 March
  - Kerstin Behrendtz, Swedish radio presenter and music director, 69 (from COVID-19)
  - Hertha Töpper, Austrian contralto, 95
- 29 March – Krzysztof Penderecki, Polish composer and conductor, 86
- 30 March – Judy Drucker, American classical music impresario, 91
- 31 March – Zoltán Peskó, Hungarian conductor and composer, 83
- 2 April – Claudio Spies, Chile-born composer, music academic and theorist, and author, 95
- 3 April – Albert K. Webster, American classical music administrator, 82 (from COVID-19)
- 4 April
  - Michel Wiblé, Swiss oboist, pedagogue and composer, 97
  - Silvano Carroli, Italian baritone, 81
  - Vincent Lionti, American opera orchestra violist and youth orchestra conductor, 61 (from COVID-19)
- 7 April
  - Gildas Delaporte, French-born orchestral double bassist active in The Netherlands, 54
  - André Stordeur, Belgian electronic music composer, 79
- 8 April
  - Eileen Croxford Parkhouse, British cellist, pedagogue, and founder of the Parkhouse Award, 96
  - Nicholas Temperley, American musicologist, 87
- 9 April
  - Dmitri Smirnov, Russian-born composer resident in the UK, 71 (from COVID-19)
  - Richard Teitelbaum, American composer, 80
- 14 April - Kerstin Meyer, Swedish mezzo-soprano, 92
- 15 April
  - Joseph Feingold, Poland-born architect, Holocaust survivor, and subject of the documentary Joe's Violin, 97 (from COVID-19)
  - Kenneth Woollam, British tenor, 83
- 16 April
  - Kenneth Gilbert, Canadian harpsichordist, organist, musicologist, and pedagogue, 88
  - Jan Talich, Czech violinist and violist, and founder of the Talich Quartet, 74
  - Maksimilijan Cenčić, Croatian conductor, 68
- 17 April
  - Arlene Saunders, American soprano, 89 (from COVID-19)
  - Paul Shelden, American clarinetist, teacher and music administrator, 79 (from COVID-19)
- 19 April – Alexander Vustin, Russian composer, 79 (from COVID-19)
- 22 April – Sir Peter Jonas, British opera and arts administrator, 73
- 24 April – David Wilder Daniels, American conductor, pedagogue and author, 86
- 25 April
  - Alan Abel, American orchestral percussionist and pedagogue, 91 (from COVID-19)
  - Vytautas Barkauskas, Lithuanian composer, 89
  - Rosemarie Wright, British pianist and pedagogue, 88
- 27 April
  - Jeannette Pilou, Greek soprano, 83
  - Lynn Harrell, American cellist, 76
- 28 April – David Boe, American organist and music academic, 84 (from COVID-19)
- 29 April – Martin Lovett, British cellist and the last surviving member of the Amadeus Quartet, 93 (from COVID-19)
- 1 May – Georg Hörtnagel, German classical music impresario and former double bass player, 93
- 3 May
  - Rosalind Elias, American mezzo-soprano, 90
  - Frederick C. Tillis, American composer, jazz saxophonist, and music academic, 90
- 6 May – Norbert Balatsch, Austrian choral conductor, 92
- 7 May – John Macurdy, American bass, 91
- 13 May – Gabriel Bacquier, French baritone, 95
- 18 May – John Poole, British organist and choral conductor, 86
- 19 May – Bert Beal, American orchestral bassoonist and regular amateur photographer for the New York Philharmonic, 93
- 24 May – James Harrison, American music academic and university administrator, 84 (from COVID-19)
- 25 May – Joel Revzen, American conductor, 74 (from COVID-19)
- 30 May
  - Mady Mesplé, French soprano, 98
  - André Emelianoff, American cellist and pedagogue, 78
- 1 June
  - Janine Reiss, French harpsichordist and academic, 99
  - Myroslav Skoryk, Ukrainian composer, conductor and pedagogue, 81
  - Marion Zarzeczna, American pianist and pedagogue, 89
- 4 June – Marcello Abbado, Italian pianist, composer, conductor and pedagogue, 93
- 7 June
  - Jolanda Meneguzzer, Italian soprano, 90
  - Edith Thallaug, Norwegian mezzo-soprano and actress, 90
- 8 June – Daniel Stolper, American oboist, 85
- 11 June – Katsuhisa Hattori, Japanese composer and conductor, 83
- 13 June – Lucy Scarbrough, American pianist and pedagogue, 92
- 14 June – Claude Samuel, French music journalist, radio producer and administrator, 88
- 17 June – Victor Feldbrill, Canadian conductor, 96
- 18 June – Nicolas Joel, French opera director and administrator, 67
- 23 June – Ryan Anthony, American orchestral trumpet player, 51
- 24 June – Jane Parker-Smith, British organist, 70
- 25 June – Marga Richter, American composer, 93
- 1 July
  - Ida Haendel, Polish-born British violinist, 96
  - Herbert Schramowski, German pianist, scholar, pedagogue, and composer, 93
- 2 July – Nikolai Kapustin, Ukrainian-born composer, 82
- 6 July – Erich Hartmann, German orchestral double bassist, 100
- 7 July – Lorenzo Arruga, Italian composer, music critic and author, 83
- 9 July – Gabriella Tucci, Italian soprano, 90
- 12 July – Eleanor Sokoloff, American pianist and pedagogue, 106
- 14 July – Gabriele Buschmeier, German musicologist, 65
- 18 July – David Jisse, French composer, radio producer, arranger and instrumentalist, 74
- 22 July – Paul Reale, American composer, 77
- 23 July – Monique Borelli, French soprano, 59
- 24 July – Humbert Camerlo, French opera director, 76
- 25 July – Bernard Ładysz, Polish bass-baritone, 98
- 27 July – Camil Marinescu, Romanian conductor, 55 (from COVID-19)
- 2 August - Leon Fleisher, American pianist, conductor and teacher, 92
- 6 August – Eldar Aliev, Azerbaijani bass, 49 (body found on reported day)
- 7 August - Constance Weldon, American tuba player and pedagogue, 88
- 8 August
  - Erich Gruenberg, Austrian-born British violinist, orchestra leader, and pedagogue, 95
  - Anatoly Duda, Ukrainian tenor and voice pedagogue, 73
- 9 August – Nathan Hull, American baritone and arts administrator, 69
- 14 August – Julian Bream, British guitarist, 87
- 16 August – Ornella Volta, Italy-born French musicologist and founder of the Fondation Erik Satie, 93
- 19 August – Randall Craig Fleischer, American conductor, 61
- 27 August – Verne Edquist, Canadian piano tuner and personal piano tuner for Glenn Gould, 89
- 30 August – Claudio Cavina, Italian countertenor and conductor, 58
- 2 September – Rinat Ibragimov, Russia-born British orchestral double bassist and past principal double bass of the London Symphony Orchestra, 60
- 6 September – Christiane Eda-Pierre, Martinique-born French soprano, 88
- 7 September – Norman Bernal, Peru-born American violinist and middle school music teacher, 75 (from COVID-19)
- 9 September – Patrick Davin, Belgian conductor, 61
- 10 September – Adrian Clarke, British baritone
- 11 September
  - Annette Jahns, German mezzo/contralto, pedagogue, and opera director, 62
  - Stéphane Caillat, French choral conductor and composer, 92
  - Christian Manen, French composer and music pedagogue, 86
- 15 September
  - Caroline Kaart, Scotland-born Dutch mezzo/alto resident, pedagogue and radio presenter, 88
  - Jan Krenz, Polish conductor and composer, 94
  - Paul Méfano, Iraq-born French composer and contemporary music advocate, 83
- 17 September – Barry Griffiths, British violinist and orchestral leader, 81
- 21 September – Jacques-Louis Monod, French and American composer, conductor and teacher, 93
- 23 September – Maurice Edwards, American stage director and actor, and orchestra administrator, 97 (from COVID-19)
- 24 September – Daniele Carnovich, Italian bass, 63
- 28 September
  - Frédéric Devreese, Netherlands-born composer, 91
  - Maynard Solomon, American music scholar and author, and record producer, 90
- 29 September
  - Isidora Žebeljan, Serbian composer, 53
  - Justin Connolly, British composer, 87
- 3 October
  - Karel Fiala, Czech tenor, 95
  - Richard Woitach, American opera conductor, 84
- 6 October – Yves Gérard, French musicologist, 88
- 7 October
  - Alexander Alexeev, Russian conductor, 82
  - Jean Martin, French pianist, 92
  - Vladislav Piavko, Russian baritone, 79
- 8 October – Erin Wall, Canadian-American soprano, 44
- 9 October – Ruth Falcon, American soprano and voice teacher, 77
- 11 October – Jon Gibson, American saxophonist and composer, 80
- 21 October – Patrick Charton, French luthier, 66
- 23 October – Ming Cho Lee, American theatre, opera, and dance set designer, 90
- 25 October
  - Rosanna Carteri, Italian soprano, 89
  - Jan Boerman, Dutch composer and specialist in electronic music, 97
  - György Fischer, Hungarian conductor and pianist, 85
- 28 October – Scott Bergeson, American opera conductor, 69
- 29 October – Alexander Vedernikov, Russian conductor, 56 (from COVID-19)
- 30 October – Arthur Wills, British organist and composer, 94
- 31 October – Yehonatan Berick, Israel-born Canadian violinist and pedagogue, 52
- 1 November
  - Pedro Iturralde, saxophonist and composer, 91
  - Eva Zikmundová, Czech soprano and pedagogue, 88
- 8 November – Alexander Buzlov, Russian cellist, 37
- 9 November – Robert Layton, British musicologist and critic, 90
- 13 November – Konrad Hünteler, German flautist, 73
- 16 November
  - Sheila Nelson, British music teacher and violinist, 84
  - Eugenia Ratti, Italian soprano, 87
- 17 November – Gabriel Chmura, Polish conductor, 74
- 18 November – Victor Danchenko, Russia-born violinist and pedagogue resident in the US, 83
- 20 November – Arthur Woodley, American bass, 71
- 25 November – Camilla Wicks, American violinist, 92
- 26 November
  - Cecilia Fusco, Italian operatic soprano, 87 (from COVID-19)
  - Kamen Tchanev, Bulgarian operatic tenor, 56 (from COVID-19)
- 28 November – Sarah Bryan Miller, American classical music critic and journalist, 68
- 30 November – Hella Brock, German musicologist, pedagogue, scholar, and specialist in the music of Edvard Grieg, 101 (from COVID-19)
- 1 December – Sophie Boulin, French soprano, 69
- 2 December – Hans Miilberg, Estonian baritone, 75
- 3 December – Noah Creshevsky, American composer, 75
- 6 December
  - Klaus Ofcarzek, Austrian actor and tenor, 81
  - Petras Bingelis, Lithuanian conductor, 79 (from COVID-19)
- 7 December – Vadim Petrov, Czech composer, 88
- 8 December – Harold Budd, American composer, 84 (from COVID-19)
- 10 December – Kenneth Alwyn, British conductor, composer and radio presenter, 95
- 15 December – Charles Shere, American composer, radio and television producer, critic and academic, 85
- 18 December
  - Brandon Townsend, Ireland-born conductor and cellist active in the US, 52
  - Robin Sutherland, American orchestral pianist, 69
- 20 December – Dame Fanny Waterman, British music teacher and founder of the Leeds International Piano Competition, 84
- 24 December
  - Ivry Gitlis, Israel-born violinist resident in France, 98
  - Catherine Ennis, British organist, 65
- 26 December
  - Florence Badol-Bertrand, French musicologist, 59
  - Shirley Young, Chinese-American businesswoman and classical music philanthropist, 85
  - Oswald Vogler, German orchestral timpanist, 90
- 28 December
  - Fou Ts'ong, China-born pianist resident in the UK, 86 (from COVID-19)
  - Paul-Heinz Dittrich, German composer, 90
- 29 December
  - Suzanne Gessner, French violinist and pedagogue, 68
  - Claude Bolling, French jazz, film, and crossover classical composer, 90
- 30 December – Sándor Sólyom-Nagy, Hungary-born baritone active in Germany, 79

== Major awards ==
- 2020 Pulitzer Prize Winner in Music: Anthony Davis and Richard Wesley - The Central Park Five

=== Grammy Awards ===
- Best Chamber Music/Small Ensemble Performance: Caroline Shaw – Orange; Attacca Quartet
- Best Choral Performance: Maurice Duruflé – 'Complete Choral Works'; Ken Cowan; Houston Chamber Choir; Robert Simpson, conductor (Signum Classics)
- Best Classical Compendium: The Poetry of Places; Nadia Shpachenko (Delos)
- Best Classical Instrumental Solo: Wynton Marsalis – Violin Concerto / Fiddle Dance Suite; Nicola Benedetti; The Philadelphia Orchestra; Cristian Măcelaru, conductor (Decca Classics)
- Best Contemporary Classical Composition: Jennifer Higdon – Harp Concerto; Yolanda Kondonassis, Rochester Philharmonic Orchestra; Ward Stare, conductor
- Best Classical Solo Vocal Album: Songplay; Joyce DiDonato; Chuck Israels, Jimmy Madison, Charlie Porter, and Craig Terry
- Best Opera Recording: Tobias Picker – Fantastic Mr Fox; John Brancy, Andrew Craig Brown, Gabriel Preisser, Krista River & Edwin Vega; Boston Modern Orchestra Project; Boston Children's Chorus; Gil Rose, conductor
- Best Engineered Album, Classical: Terry Riley – Sun Rings; Leslie Ann Jones, engineer; John Kilgore, Judith Sherman & David Harrington, engineers/mixers; Robert C. Ludwig, mastering engineer (Nonesuch)
- Best Orchestral Performance: Andrew Norman – Sustain; Los Angeles Philharmonic; Gustavo Dudamel, conductor (Deutsche Grammophon)
- Producer of the Year, Classical: Blanton Alspaugh

=== Victoires de la musique Classique ===
- Victoire d'honneur: Anna Netrebko, Philippe Jaroussky
- Recording of the Year: Saint-Saëns – Piano Concertos Nos 3–5; Alexandre Kotorow, Tapiola Sinfonietta; Jean-Jacques Kantorow, conductor (BIS)
- Artiste Lyrique: Karine Deshayes, Benjamin Bernheim
- Instrumental soloist: Alexandre Kotorow
- Composer: Camille Pépin – The Sound of Trees
- Révélation Artiste Lyrique – Marie Perbost
- Révélation Soliste Instrumental – Gabriel Pidoux

=== Gramophone Classical Music Awards 2020 ===
- Chamber: Bartók – Piano Quintet / Veress – String Trio; Vilde Frang; Barnabás Kelemen; Katalin Kokas; Lawrence Power; Nicolas Altstaedt; Alexander Lonquich (Alpha Classics)
- Choral: J.S. Bach – St Matthew Passion; Benjamin Bruns, Damien Guillon, Christian Immler, Toru Kaku, Clint van der Linde, Aki Matsui, Makoto Sakurada, Carolyn Sampson, Zachary Wilder; Bach Collegium Japan; Masaaki Suzuki, conductor (BIS)
- Concerto: Chopin – Piano Concertos; Benjamin Grosvenor; Royal Scottish National Orchestra; Elim Chan, conductor (Decca Classics)
- Contemporary: Thomas Adès - Piano Concerto / Totentanz; Kirill Gerstein, Mark Stone, Christianne Stotijn; Boston Symphony Orchestra; Thomas Adès, conductor (Deutsche Grammophon)
- Early Music: Gesualdo - Madrigali, Libri primo & secondo; Les Arts Florissants; Paul Agnew (harmonia mundi) (Hyperion)
- Instrumental: Beethoven - Complete Piano Sonatas; Igor Levit (Sony Classical)
- Opera: Handel – Agrippina; Joyce DiDonato, Elsa Benoit, Luca Pisaroni, Franco Fagioli, Jakub Józef Orliński, Andrea Mastroni, Carlo Vistoli, Biagio Pizzuti, Marie-Nicole Lemieux; Il Pomo d'Oro; Maxim Emelyanychev, conductor (Erato)
- Orchestral: Mieczysław Weinberg - Symphonies Nos 2 and 21; Gidon Kremer; Kremerata Baltica; City of Birmingham Symphony Orchestra; Mirga Gražinytė-Tyla, conductor (Deutsche Grammophon)
- Recital: Si j'ai aimé (Berlioz, Théodore Dubois; Duparc; Massenet; Saint-Saëns; Vierne); Sandrine Piau; Le Concert de la Loge; Julien Chauvin, director (Alpha Classics)
- Solo Vocal: Janáček - The Diary of One Who Disappeared, Nursery Rhymes, Moravian Folk Poetry in Songs; Nicky Spence; Václava Housková; Victoria Samek; Julius Drake (Hyperion)
- Recording of the Year: Mieczysław Weinberg - Symphonies Nos 2 and 21; Gidon Kremer; Kremerata Baltica; City of Birmingham Symphony Orchestra; Mirga Gražinytė-Tyla, conductor (Deutsche Grammophon)
- Concept Album: From the Ground Up: The Chaconne; Hugo Ticciati; o/modernt (Signum Classics)
- Beethoven 250 Award: Beethoven – Piano Concertos Nos 2 and 5; Martin Helmchen; Deutsches Symphonie-Orchester Berlin; Andrew Manze, conductor (Alpha Classics)
- Young Artist of the Year: Natalya Romaniw
- Label of the Year: Alpha Classics
- Artist of the Year: Igor Levit
- Orchestra of the Year: The Philadelphia Orchestra
- Special Achievement: Robert von Bahr
- Lifetime Achievement: Itzhak Perlman

=== 2020 Royal Philharmonic Society Awards ===
- RPS Gold Medal: John Williams
- Chamber-Scale Composition: Naomi Pinnock, I am, I am
- Concert Series & Events: Venus Unwrapped - Kings Place
- Conductor: Dalia Stasevska
- Ensemble: Scottish Ensemble
- Gamechanger: Jane Glover
- Impact: Sound Young Minds - City of London Sinfonia
- Inspiration:
  - Concerteenies
  - Diocese of Leeds Schools Singing Programme
  - Stay At Home Choir
  - The Opera Story's Episodes
  - #UriPosteJukeBox
  - Virtual Benedetti Sessions
- Instrumentalist: Lawrence Power
- Large-Scale Composition: Frank Denyer - The Fish that Became the Sun (Songs of the Dispossessed)
- Opera & Music Theatre: The Turn of the Screw - Garsington Opera
- Singer: Natalya Romaniw
- Storytelling: Stephen Hough - Rough Ideas
- Young Artists: Sheku Kanneh-Mason

=== Ivors Composer Awards ===
- Chamber Orchestral: Robin Haigh – Grin
- Choral: Richard Blackford – Pietà
- Community and Participation: Oliver Vibrans – More Up
- Innovation – Yazz Ahmed
- Jazz Composition for Large Ensemble: Charlie Bates – Crepuscule
- Jazz Composition for Small Ensemble: Renell Shaw – The Vision They Had
- Large Chamber: Oliver Leith – Honey Siren
- Large Orchestral: Jonny Greenwood – Horror vacui
- Outstanding Works Collection: Cecilia McDowell
- Small Chamber: Daniel Fardon – Six Movements
- Solo or Duo: Gareth Moorcraft – Diaries of the Early Worm
- Sound Art: Kathy Hinde – Twittering Machines
- Stage Works: Philip Venables – Denis & Katya
