= Caillat =

Caillat is a French surname. Notable people with the surname include:

- Colbie Caillat (born 1985), American singer-songwriter
- Colette Caillat (1921–2007), French professor
- Dominique Caillat (born 1956), Swiss playwright
- Ken Caillat (born 1946), American record producer
- Stéphane Caillat (1928–2020), French composer
