= Daniel Fardon =

British classical composer

Daniel Fardon (born 1991) is a British composer of contemporary classical music.

== Biography ==
Fardon studied Music at the Royal Birmingham Conservatoire, where his composition teachers included Howard Skempton and Errollyn Wallen. He studied conducting under Edwin Roxburgh.

Fardon went on to study for an MPhil in Composition at the University of Cambridge, where he was tutored by Professor Richard Causton. In 2018, he graduated with a PhD in Composition on the topic of tonality from the University of Birmingham, under the supervision of Professor Michael Zev Gordon.

Fardon was the Rosie Johnson Apprentice Composer at the Wigmore Hall during 2018-19. In 2018 he won the Royal Philharmonic Society Composition Prize, and in 2020 he received an Ivor Novello Award for his music.

Fardon is the Artistic Director of Hackney Music Live, a charity which organises concerts in the London Borough of Hackney. He teaches at the Purcell School for Young Musicians.

== Music ==
Fardon’s early commissions included Three Short Pieces for the Stratford-on-Avon music festival in 2012, and a piano work for Flatpack Film Festival in 2013. His piece Freundschaftsbeziehungen was commissioned by the King's Lynn Festival in 2015. His work Black Eyes for soprano and tenor voice, which explores the theme of alien abduction as a coping mechanism for psychological trauma, toured the UK in 2015. In 2016, Fardon’s work Flux was performed by the London Symphony Orchestra as part of the Panufnik Composers Scheme, conducted by François-Xavier Roth. Fardon’s October Tune was premièred by members of the Bournemouth Symphony Orchestra in 2017, and subsequently performed by members of the London Symphony Orchestra.

Fardon won the Royal Philharmonic Society Composition Prize in 2018 and was commissioned by the Royal Philharmonic Society to write a new string quartet. The resulting piece, Six Movements, was premièred by the Bloomsbury Quartet at the Wigmore Hall. June Tune, for piano quartet, was performed by members of the London Symphony Orchestra in 2020. His work Elements of Disco was commissioned by Cheltenham Music Festival in 2020 and premièred live on BBC Radio 3 by the Carducci Quartet, broadcast from St David's Hall in Cardiff in the absence of an audience as a result of the COVID-19 pandemic.

Fardon was commissioned by Coventry City of Culture 2021 and the Arts Council England to write a two-hour theatrical symphony for the Orchestra of the Swan, which formed part of a large-scale year-long project involving people from the Coventry community. The resulting work, Symphony of Us, was performed three times in Coventry Cathedral in 2022, conducted by Fardon, and was featured on BBC Midlands Today and BBC Radio CWR.

Fardon's August Tune: Running Music was performed by the Purcell Symphony Orchestra in 2023 at St John's Smith Square, conducted by Paul Mann, and subsequently at the Royal Birmingham Conservatoire. 2023 also saw performances of his Six Movements live on BBC Radio 3 as well as at the Wigmore Hall.

In 2024, Fardon was commissioned by the London Symphony Orchestra to write the original music for a series of children’s concerts based on the book Lost and Found by Oliver Jeffers. Fardon's collaboration with the London Symphony Orchestra continued in 2025 with the release of Fardon's work Flux, as part of the Panufnik Legacies programme.

Fardon was the recipient of an Ivor Novello Award in 2020 for his string quartet Six Movements.

Fardon’s music is notable for its exploration of aesthetic pluralism and themes of past and contemporary culture.

== Notable works ==
- Black Eyes, for soprano and tenor voice (2015)
- Flux, for symphony orchestra (2016)
- October Tune, for sextet (2017)
- Three Movements, for chamber ensemble (2018)
- Piano Suite No. 3 (2018)
- Somewhere Among the Clouds Above, for soprano and alto saxophone (2018)
- June Tune, for piano quartet (2019)
- Six Movements, for string quartet (2019)
- Elements of Disco, for string quartet (2020)
- Symphony of Us, for chamber orchestra and narrators (2022)
- August Tune: Running Music, for symphony orchestra (2023)
- Lost and Found, for narrator and chamber ensemble (2024)
- Constance Pilkington, for electronics (2025)

== See also ==
- Major awards in 2020 classical music
