= HIDALGO Festival =

HIDALGO Festival für junge Klassik (The HIDALGO Festival for Young Classical Music) is an annual classical music festival in Munich, Germany, which first took place in 2018. It features young, successful artists from all over Europe. It is named after the Lied "Der Hidalgo" by Robert Schumann. According to the magazine "Crescendo" the HIDALGO is one of the "most exciting young and innovative classical music festivals with a focus on Lied in the world." The patron is star baritone Christian Gerhaher.

== Program ==
The festival features cross-divisional in-house productions and international Artists, and the musical focus is on Kunstlied and vocal music.

The installations are rarely performed in normal concert halls. Previous performance venues have included clubs, barber shops, bouldering halls, boxing studios, Concrete plants, hotel lobbies and parking garages. HIDALGO performs the productions created at the festival in guest performances and develops artistic projects beyond the festival. Productions combine classical music with sound and Video installations, visual and digital art, performance, drama, dance, Sports, slam poetry, street music, chamber music, and electronic dance music, among others. Productions, installations, and music theater are created in interdisciplinary work.

Artists perform Lieder and works from the Classical and Romantic periods (e.g. by Ludwig van Beethoven, Franz Schubert, Robert Schumann and Hugo Wolf), and from the Classical Modern period (e.g. by Benjamin Britten, Hanns Eisler, Dmitri Shostakovich and Igor Stravinsky), as well as new compositions.

== Cast ==
The cast includes young artists from all over Europe, who have made it or are about to make it to big stages like English National Opera, La Scala in Milan or Vienna State Opera. They include, among others, Anna-Doris Capitelli, Carolina Eyck, Mirjam Mesak, Idunnu Münch, Andromahi Raptis, Corinna Scheurle, Hagar Sharvit, Manuel Walser and Jonathan Ware.

HIDALGO's own collective, under director Tom Wilmersdörffer, develops artistic ideas and productions for its own festival and for other festivals and concert and theater houses. The HIDALGO Festival Orchestra under conductor Johanna Malangré is composed of members and academists of the Munich Philharmonic Orchestra, the Bavarian State Orchestra, and the Bavarian Radio Symphony Orchestra, among others.

The HIDALGO is led by co-managing directors Philipp Nowotny and Tom Wilmersdörffer. Wilmersdörffer, whose idea the festival is based on, is the artistic director. Musical director is Johanna Malangré, the designated principal conductor of the Orchestre National de Picardie in Amiens.

== Awards ==
- 2022: EFFE Label, awarded by the European Festivals Association
- 2021: EFFE Label, awarded by the European Festivals Association
- 2020: Culture Star of the Year, awarded by the Abendzeitung newspaper
- 2020: Funding by the German Federal Cultural Foundation
- 2019: Scholarship "Young Art / New Media", awarded by the City of Munich (Tom Wilmersdörffer, director)
