= Matthew Whiteside =

- Genre: Classical
- Occupation: Composer
- Years active: 2008–present
- Website: https://www.matthewwhiteside.co.uk

Matthew Whiteside (born 1988) is a composer based in Scotland. His work includes opera, chamber music, sound installations and soundtracks.

== Career ==
Originally from Northern Ireland, Whiteside moved to Glasgow after studying music at Queen's University, Belfast. In 2012, he was awarded his masters in composition from the Royal Conservatoire of Scotland, and since then has worked as a freelance composer. His work has been featured in Sound Festival, the Cottier Chamber Project, Edinburgh Festival Fringe (as part of the Made in Scotland Showcase) and the NI Science Festival. His music has been performed by the RTÉ National Symphony Orchestra, Scottish Opera Connect, Cappella Nova, Red Note Ensemble, Ensemble Offspring, the United Strings of Europe and Garth Knox and broadcast on BBC Scotland, BBC Radio Scotland, BBC Radio Ulster, RTÉ lyric fm, BBC Radio 3, BBC 6 Music CyBC and WFMT.

With support from Creative Scotland, in 2015, Whiteside released his debut album Dichroic Light featuring a selection of music for soloists and chamber ensembles both acoustic and with live electronics. Solo for Viola D’amore and Live Electronics, recorded by Emma Lloyd and featured on Dichroic Light, was described as having the overall effect of ‘one of meditation – a Japanese stone garden whose raked ripples have been brought into sound’. The same year he was commissioned to collaborate with artist Dominika Mayovich on When Two Worlds Collide, an interactive installation for R-Space Gallery and Sound Scotland, and he scored the documentary, Michael Palin's Quest for Artemisia for BBC 4 directed by Eleanor Yule and Bernd Porr's indie feature film, Anna Unbound.

Whiteside was commissioned in 2016 by Lorimer Productions to compose Nobilis Humilis inspired by the hymn to St Magnus, "Nobilis, humilis" for Cappella Nova's Echoes and Traces tour. The same year he was commissioned by Cottier Chamber Project to compose a piece based on the work of Lord Kelvin and John Stewart Bell for Juice Vocal Ensemble, Glasgow University Chapel Choir and Davur Juul Magnussen trombone ensemble for performance in the University of Glasgow Cloisters. The resulting piece was called Always Ever Unknowable with words written by Danish Playwright Helene Grøn. He also attended Magnetic North's Rough Mix residency in Aberdeen.

In 2017, Whiteside was commissioned by Scottish Opera to again collaborate with Helene Grøn for a short opera for Scottish Opera Connect called Little Black Lies. He was also accepted onto the RTÉ NSO/CMC composer lab to write Repercussive and commissioned by the Institute of Physics for the NI Science Festival to collaborate with Marisa Zanotti on writing Entangled for string quartet, electronics and film based on the work of John Stewart Bell for and premièred at the NI Science Festival 2018 by the Aurea Quartet. This work was also featured on his second album Entangled release in October 2019. He also scored David Graham Scott's The End of the Game and was supported by Creative Scotland to attended the Atelier for Young Festival and Cultural Managers in Shanghai run by the European Festivals Association.

While still a student he founded Edit-Point with fellow composer Timothy Cooper. Together, along with Nicholas Virgo and Louise Rossiter, they produced 16 concerts of electroacoustic music including concerts at Sound Scotland, Belfast Festival at Queen's and Glasgow City Halls.

In 2016, Whiteside began The Night With... putting contemporary classical music into informal venues. The Night With... became a SCIO in 2018 with Whiteside as CEO & Artistic Director. As of December 2018 he has produced 17 concerts in Glasgow, Edinburgh and Aberdeen as The Night With...

Along with his concert work, in 2023 Whiteside self-published The Guidebook to Self-Releasing Your Music to support composers and musicians through a self‑release process and share his experiences of releasing his own music and developing the record label of The Night With....

== Prizes and awards ==
- 2023
  - (Shortlisted) The Royal Conservatoire of Scotland Award for New Music Trailblazer
- 2021
  - Award for Large Scale New Work (11+ performers), sponsored by PRS for Music at the Scottish Awards for New Music for Night Thoughts
- 2020
  - The SMIA Award for Creative Programming at the Scottish Awards for New Music for The Night With... 2019 season
- 2019
  - The List Hot 100
- 2018
  - Light Moves Innovative Use of Sound Award
  - (Shortlisted) Best Musical Artist – Sunday Herald Culture Awards
  - PRS for Music Foundation Classical:Next Fellow
- 2017
  - One To Watch – Sunday Herald Culture Awards
  - Scottish Opera, Opera Sparks

== Selected compositions ==
- Speak Ye (Un)comfortably (2024; viola, accordion)
- Emptiness (2023; soprano, string orchestra)
- Ground, Air, Life (2021; flute, clarinet, horn, percussion, violin, cello)
- Night Thoughts (2020; flute, clarinet, trombone, percussion, piano, electric guitar, violin, viola, cello, double bass)
- Rama (2019; flute, bass clarinet, percussion, piano)
- Quartet No. 6 (2019; string quartet)
- Quartet No. 5 (2019; string quartet)
- ...Everyone is a Child of the Inbetween... (2018; soprano and clarinet. Words by Helene Grøn)
- Quartet No. 4, Entangled (2017; string quartet, electronics and film)
- Little Black Lies (2017; soloists, chorus and ensemble. Libretto by Helene Grøn)
- Repercussive (2017; orchestra)
- Piece for Violin and Bass Clarinet (2017)
- Dry Vista (2016; contrabass flute and electronics)
- Nobilis Humilis (2016; choir)
- Always Ever Unknowable (2016; vocal trio, choir and trombone quartet. Words by Helene Grøn)
- Unda Malacia (2016; tape)
- Exhibition Music (2015; 2x bass clarinet, violin, viola, cello and electronics)
- Solo for Viola D’amore and Electronics (2015)
- Three Pieces for Bass Clarinet and Electronics (2014)
- Quartet for Violin, Viola, Cello and Double Bass (2013)
- Well, Well, Well (2013; flute, viola, double bass)
- Ulation (2013; viola and live electronics)
- Vociferous Palpitation (2012; tape)
- Dichroic Light (2011; cello and electronics)
- Quartet No. 3 (2011; string quartet and electronics)
- The World in an Oyster, the Oyster in the World (2011; piano trio)
- for Matt Mattera (2010; trumpet)
- Puddle Wonderful (2009; female soloists and chamber orchestra)
- Quartet No. 1 (2008; string quartet)

== Recordings ==
Dichroic Light – IMBT 1501

Anna Unbound – IMBT 1502

Exhibition Music – IMBT 1601

Piece for Violin and Bass Clarinet – IMBT 1701

...Everyone is a Child of the Inbetween... – IMBT 1801

Unda Malacia – MW 1901

Entangled – MW 1902
