= The Night With... =

Classical music production company in Glasgow

- Genre: Contemporary Classical Music
- Dates: 2016 onwards
- Locations: Scotland and Northern Ireland
- Country: United Kingdom
- Website: http://www.thenightwith.com

The Night With... is a classical music production company based in Glasgow, touring concerts across Scotland and the United Kingdom.

== History ==
Started in 2016 by Matthew Whiteside, The Night With... presents music, primarily contemporary classical, in informal venues. The concerts are presented in three 15 to 30 minute thirds, rather than the traditional concert halves, to create a more informal and relaxed atmosphere for audience members. Since it began it has provided development and commissioning opportunities for young and emerging composers and performers. Since 2017 it has run a Call for Scores for emerging composers.

The aim of The Night With... is to create a touring network across the UK with the same programmes repeated multiple times. The 2019 season featured the same programmes in Glasgow, Edinburgh, Aberdeen and Belfast and was part of the Made in Scotland Showcase at the Edinburgh Fringe.

The concert series has slowly gained a following and generated positive reviews in the press.

In 2019, 'The Night With... began releasing live recordings from the season on its label, TNW Music. This culminated in the release of The Night With... Live Vol. One.

== Awards ==
- 2019 – Shortlisted for the Award for Creative Programming at the Scottish Awards for New Music
- 2020 – Shortlisted for the RCS Award for Making it Happen at the Scottish Awards for New Music
- 2020 – Winner of the SMIA Award for Creative Programming at the Scottish Awards for New Music

== Performers ==
2016

- Red Note Ensemble
- Electric Clarinet
- Carla Rees

2017

- Red Note Ensemble
- Tom Poulson, Danielle Price and Timothy Cooper
- Joanna Nicholson and Emma Lloyd
- The Aurea Quartet

2018

- Wooden Elephant
- James Turnbull
- Juice Vocal Ensemble
- Turning the Elements

2019

- Duo van Vliet
- Turning the Elements
- Tom Poulson, Danielle Price and Timothy Cooper
- Ensemble Offspring
- Garth Knox
- Ensemble 1604
- The Hermes Experiment

== Venues ==
- The Hug and Pint, Glasgow
- Fruitmarket Gallery, Edinburgh
- Scottish Storytelling Centre, Edinburgh
- Stills Gallery, Edinburgh
- BrewDog Castlegate, Aberdeen
- The Belmont Cinema, Aberdeen
- Black Box, Belfast

== World premières ==
The following works received their world première at The Night With...

Date of Première	Work	Composer	Performer	Work Details	Awards
11/4/2017	Maze-Vortex (White Light)	Nina Whiteman	Emma Lloyd and Joanna Nicholson	Violin and Clarinet	
11/4/2017	Piece for Violin and Bass Clarinet	Matthew Whiteside	Emma Lloyd and Joanna Nicholson	Violin and Clarinet	
3/5/2017	Meltwater	George Stevenson	The Aurea Quartet	String Quartet. Winner of the 2017 Call for Scores	
14/6/2017	Asper Strata	Diana Salazar	Tom Poulson	Trumpet and electronics	
14/6/2017	Breathing Space	Timothy Cooper	Danielle Price and Timothy Cooper	Tuba and electronics	
11/9/2018	Athbhreithnigh	Elizabeth Hoffman	James Turnbull	Oboe and electronics	
11/9/2018	Three Questions	Peter Gregson	James Turnbull	Oboe and electronics	
8/10/2018	...everyone is a child of the inbetween...	Matthew Whiteside	Turning the Elements	Soprano and Clarinet. Text by Helene Grøn	
8/10/2018	Lux Aeterna	Joanna Nicholson	Turning the Elements	Soprano and Clarinet. Text by Nan Shepherd	
13/11/2018	I Regret Your Sex	Claire McCue	Juice Vocal Ensemble	Female vocal trio	Shortlisted in the Scottish Awards for New Music Dorico Award for Small / Medium Scale Work sponsored by Steinberg (1-10 performers)
13/11/2018	Rowantree	Sheena Philips	Juice Vocal Ensemble	Female vocal trio. Winner of the 2018 Call for Scores	
13/11/2018	Blackberry Wassail	Emily Doolittle	Juice Vocal Ensemble	Female vocal trio	
13/8/2019	Gyre	Joanna Nicholson	Turning the Elements	Soprano, Clarinet and Tape	
19/8/2019	Oscillate	Linda Buckley	Duo van Vliet	Viola, Accordion and Electronics	
19/8/2019	Black Box	Richard Greer	Duo van Vliet	Viola, Accordion and Electronics	
9/9/2019	Rama	Matthew Whiteside	Ensemble Offspring	Flute, Clarinet, Percussion and Piano	
9/9/2019	Mesmerism	Paul Mac	Ensemble Offspring	Flute, Clarinet, Percussion, Piano and Tape	
9/9/2019	Glow	Jane Stanley	Ensemble Offspring	Flute, Clarinet, Percussion and Piano	
7/10/2019	I Said	Nora Marazaite	Garth Knox	Viola D'amore	
25/11/2019	Daily Rituals	Matthew Grouse	The Hermes Experiment	Soprano, Clarinet, Harp, Double Bass and Tape	
25/11/2019	to sleep on it	Ruari Paterson-Achenbach	The Hermes Experiment	Soprano, Clarinet, Harp and Double Bass. Winner of the 2019 Call for Scores	
10/12/2019	...shadows that in darkness dwell...	Timothy Cooper	Ensemble 1604	Counter-tenor, Recorder, Theorbo, Cello and Electronics	Shortlist in The Ivors Academy Composer Awards 2020: Small Chamber Shortlisted in The Scottish Awards for New Music award for Electroacoustic / Sound Art 2020
