= Jeannette Pilou =

Greek soprano (1937–2020)

Jeannette Pilou (Greek: Ζανέτ Πηλού) (11 July 1937 - 27 April 2020) was a Greek operatic soprano.

A native of Alexandria, Pilou was born to Greek parents resident in Egypt. She underwent her initial vocal studies in the country of her birth before traveling to Italy to study under Carla Castellani. In 1959 she made her operatic debut at Milan's Teatro Smeraldo as Violetta. In 1964 she appeared in La bohème at the Vienna State Opera; she soon embarked upon an international career which took her to London, Brussels, Amsterdam, Hamburg, Hannover, Cologne, Genoa, Budapest, Paris, Barcelona, Lisbon, Chicago, New Orleans, Houston, Philadelphia and Buenos Aires.

Pilou debuted at the Metropolitan Opera on 7 October 1967 singing the role of Juliette in Roméo et Juliette; during her career there she also sang Mimì in La bohème; Micaëla in Carmen; Zerlina in Don Giovanni; Nanetta in Falstaff; Marguerite in Faust; Cio-Cio-San in Madama Butterfly; Susanna in Le nozze di Figaro; Nedda in Pagliacci; Mélisande in Pelléas et Mélisande; and Violetta. For the Royal Opera House in 1971 she performed Cio-Cio-San. For Seattle Opera and Portland Opera she sang Marguerite in 1979. At the San Francisco Opera she performed as Zerlina, Marguerite, Cio-Cio-San, and Mélisande. She also performed at the Aix-en-Provence Festival, the Internationale Maifestspiele Wiesbaden, and the Arena di Verona. At the Opéra de Monte-Carlo, she created the lead role in La reine morte of Renzo Rossellini in 1973. Pilou was a regular at the Greek National Opera from 1969 until 1985, performing such roles as Liú, Susanna, Cio-Cio-San, Donna Elvira in Don Giovanni, Desdemona, and Marguerite. She was Mélisande in the Greek premiere of Pelléas et Mélisande in 1998.

During her career, Pilou was described as "a little bit East, a little bit West". For her services to music, she was named a Chevalier of the Ordre des Arts et des Lettres. She was among the founding members of the "Maria Callas Scholarship" foundation.
