= Humbert Camerlo =

French film director (1943–2020)

- Born: 18 December 1943; Villeurbanne, France
- Died: 24 July 2020 (aged 76)
- Occupation: Opera Director

Humbert Camerlo (18 December 1943 – 24 July 2020) was a French opera director.

== Career ==
=== Directed Productions ===
- Bluebeard's Castle (1964, 1967, 1980)
- Symphonie de danse (1966)
- Erwartung (1967, 1968, 1969, 1980)
- Die glückliche Hand (1968)
- Begleitungsmusik zu einer Lichtspielscene (1968, 1969)
- A Survivor from Warsaw (1969)
- The Rake's Progress (1969)
- Lohengrin (1969)
- Tannhäuser (1969)
- Carmen (1969)
- The Gypsy Baron (1969)
- Tosca (1970)
- Dialogues of the Carmelites (1970)
- Mireille (1970)
- L'heure espagnole (1970)
- Les Espagnols à Venise (1970, 1985)
- Ciboulette (1970)
- The Merry Widow (1971)
- The Me Nobody Knows (1971)
- Cami-Camerlo (1971)
- La fille de Madame Angot (1972)
- Eugene Onegin (1975)
- Pagliacci (1976)
- Intégrale Erik Satie (1978)
- Der Jahreslauf (1979)
- Hommage à Picasso (1981)
- L'elisir d'amore (1981)
- The Marriage of Figaro (1983)
- Mavra (1984, 2001)
- Don Pasquale (1985)
- The Breasts of Tiresias (1986)
- Simon Boccanegra (1991)
- Édredon ler, roi de la lune (1993)
- Attila (2002)
- La Farce de maître Pathelin (2002, 2003)
