= Dominique Caillat =

Swiss playwright and writer

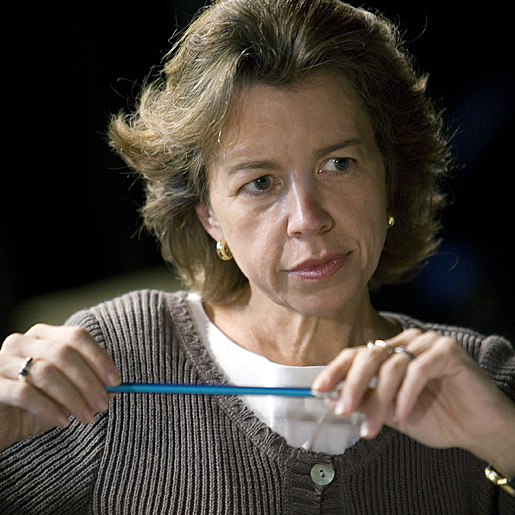
Dominique Caillat

Dominique Caillat (pronounced [dɔminik kaja], born 1956) is a Swiss playwright and writer. She lives in Berlin and works in German, French and English.

== Life and work ==
Caillat was born in Washington, D.C. in 1956. After studying law and passing bar examinations in Geneva and New York City, Dominique Caillat briefly worked as an international lawyer before turning to literature and the stage, receiving a basic training in acting and directing.

In 1993, she moved to Germany and established in Burg Namedy, near Koblenz, the youth acting school "Theater in der Vorburg". Over the next 6 years, she wrote and directed 6 plays for her company, which soon became a regular guest at theatre events and festivals. In 1998, Caillat's play and production of Leb wohl, Schmetterling (Farewell Butterfly), about the Theresienstadt Ghetto in Terezín, won the Rheinland-Pfalz Youth Cultural Prize and was performed in the German Parliament for the Commemoration of the Victims of National Socialism, as well as in Terezín, Prague, Tel Aviv and Jerusalem, among many other cities. Caillat closed the "Theater in der Vorburg" in 2000, to devote herself to writing fiction, non-fiction and plays.

Her work focuses on sensitive political and social issues, and is typically based on comprehensive research. Her past topics include the Third Reich, to which she devoted two plays, Leb wohl, Schmetterling and Wir gehören zusammen, as well as scenes for Hans Krása's children opera Brundibár, Prolog, Szene und Epilog, commissioned by the Vienna Chamber opera. She also wrote extensively about the Israeli-Palestinian conflict, spending much time in the Middle-East conducting interviews on both sides of the Green Line. Her experiences are summarized in her book La Paix ou la mort – Dans les coulisses du drame isrélo-palestinien (Peace or Death). Her latest play, commissioned by the Swiss Academy of Natural Science, deals with Charles Darwin, evolution and bioethics (La Confession de Darwin and its German version Darwins Beichte).

== Plays ==
Youth Theatre

- Caspar Hauser (1993)
- Les Misérables, adapted from Victor Hugo (1994)
- Ein Schloss erzählt (1995)
- Brunos Traum (Festivalstern Jugendtheater Rheinland-Pfalz 1996)
- Leb wohl, Schmetterling (Kultursommer Rheinland-Pfalz, Burgfestpiele Mayen 1998; Nine Gates International Festival of Jewish Culture Prague 2000)
- Wir gehören zusammen (Festivalstern Jugendtheater Rheinland-Pfalz and Burgfestspiele Mayen 1999)

Drama

- Prolog, Szene und Epilog for Brundibár (Vienna Chamber opera and ORF 1999)
- Niemandsland, about youth violence (Kulturfabrik Koblenz, 2003)
- Kidnapping, about the Israeli-Palestinian conflict (Premiered 2004 at the Staatstheater Mainz, German national tour 2005)
- État de piège, thoroughly overhauled version of Kidnapping (Théâtre de Carouge, Geneva 2007)
- Darwins Beichte (Swiss-German tour 2009)
- La Confession de Darwin (Swiss-French tour 2009)

Site Specific Theatre

- Gladiator Valerius (Amphitheatre Trier 2000)
- Der ewige Soldat (Ehrenbreitstein fortress 2001)
- Die Muse von Stolzenfels (Stolzenfels castle 2003)
- Der kunstsinnige König (Villa Ludwigshöhe 2006)

Books

- La Paix ou la mort – Dans les coulisses du drame israélo-palestinien (Labor & Fides, Geneva 2007)

Films

- Leb wohl, Schmetterling, Documentary Film of Olga Struškova (Jerusalem Film Festival, Czech Television 1998)

== Awards ==
- 1998: Children and Youth Cultural Prize of Rheinland-Pfalz for Leb wohl, Schmetterling, play
- 1999: "Forum Artis plaudit" Prize of the Mayen-Koblenz District for Wir gehören zusammen, play
- 2009: Award of the Pro Helvetia Foundation The Children's Passion, Oratorium-Libretto
