= Johanna Malangré =

Johanna Malangré (born 1989 in Cologne) is a German conductor. Since 2022, she has served as General Music Director of the Orchestre de Picardie in Amiens, France.

== Biography ==
Johanna Malangré completed her conducting studies in the class of Johannes Schläfli in Zurich. Her teachers and mentors include Bernard Haitink, Paavo Järvi, Nicolas Pasquet, and Reinhard Goebel. She was a conducting fellow at the Lucerne Festival Academy and served as an assistant conductor with the Bergische Symphoniker and the Kammeroper Köln. In 2019, she won first prize at the MAWOMA Conducting Competition in Vienna.

Since 2019, she has been the Musical Director of the Hidalgo Festival for young classical music in Munich. The Hidalgo Festival Orchestra, which she founded, is composed of members and academy participants from major Munich-based ensembles, including the Bavarian State Orchestra, the Munich Philharmonic, and the Bavarian Radio Symphony Orchestra.

Additionally, she served as an assistant conductor for the Lucerne Festival Contemporary Orchestra. As a guest conductor, she has worked with the Orchestre National de France, the Munich Radio Orchestra, the Wuppertal Symphony Orchestra, the Kiel Philharmonic, the Orchestre National de Bretagne, the Orchestre de Pau Pays de Béarn, the Lucerne Symphony Orchestra, Musikkollegium Winterthur, the Bern Symphony Orchestra, Collegium Novum Zürich, the Munich Symphony Orchestra, the Orchestre de l’Opéra Royal de Versailles, the Orchestre Lamoureux, and the Vienna Chamber Orchestra. Future debuts will take her to the Staatsphilharmonie Ludwigshafen, the Orchestre Victor Hugo Franche-Comté, the Opéra de Limoges, the Real Filharmonía de Galicia, the Istanbul State Symphony Orchestra, the Dortmund Philharmonic, and the Göttingen Symphony Orchestra. Since 2022, Johanna Malangré has served as General Music Director of the Orchestre de Picardie (Orchestre National en Région Hauts-de-France) in Amiens.

== Awards ==
2019: First Prize and Orchestra Prize at the MAWOMA (Music And Women Maestra) Conducting Competition in Vienna.
