= Elegy (Kernis) =

Musical composition by Aaron Jay Kernis

Elegy – for those we lost (sometimes written as to those we lost) is a musical composition written in May 2020 by the American composer Aaron Jay Kernis. The piece was written during the height of the COVID-19 pandemic in the United States shortly after the composer had recovered from a mild case of the illness himself and is thus dedicated "to beloved victims of COVID-19, and their families, in mourning." It was originally composed for solo piano and was virtually premiered by the composer on YouTube on May 15, 2020. However, Kernis later made arrangements of the work for various other ensembles, including harp and trumpet duet, string orchestra, and orchestra, among others. The piece is cast in a single movement and lasts about six minutes.

== Instrumentation ==
=== Chamber orchestra ===
The chamber orchestra arrangement of Elegy calls for piccolo, two flutes (2nd doubling piccolo), two oboes, two clarinets, two bassoons, two horns, two trumpets, timpani, harp (optional), and strings.

=== Orchestra ===
The full orchestral arrangement of Elegy is cast for piccolo, two flutes, two oboes, two clarinets, two bassoons, contrabassoon (optional), four horns, two trumpet, two trombones, bass trombone, tuba, timpani, five percussionists, harp, and strings.
