= Tom Coult =

- Born: 1988; London, UK
- Genres: Classical
- Website: tomcoult.com

Tom Coult (born 1988) is an English composer.

== Career ==
From 2021, he has been Composer-in-Association with BBC Philharmonic Orchestra. The post has seen premieres of Pleasure Garden, a concerto for violinist Daniel Pioro, several arrangements of baroque and medieval music, After Lassus with soprano Anna Dennis, and Three Pieces that Disappear for orchestra, amongst a number of other repeat performances.

His opera Violet, with text by playwright Alice Birch, was commissioned by Music Theatre Wales and Britten Pears Arts. At its premiere at the Aldeburgh Festival, The Telegraph described it as ‘the best new British opera in years’, and The Stage said it was ‘the finest joint UK operatic debut since Martin Crimp and George Benjamin collaborated on Into the Little Hill in 2006’. It has been staged in further productions by Theater Ulm and by L'aurore boréale in Paris. It won or was nominated for: an International Opera Award, a South Bank Sky Arts Award, a Critics Circle Award, IVORS Composer Award and a UK Theatre Award.

Other pieces have been performed at the First Night of the BBC Proms (St John’s Dance for the BBC Symphony Orchestra), Aldeburgh Festival (Beautiful Caged Thing for the Mahler Chamber Orchestra), and Amsterdam Concertgebouw (Sonnet Machine with Netherlands Radio Philharmonic).

He has been Composer-in-Residence at Musikdorf Ernen and Oxford International Song Festival, and was Visiting Fellow Commoner in the Creative Arts at Trinity College Cambridge between 2017 and 2019.

== Education ==
He studied at the University of Manchester with Camden Reeves and subsequently with Sir George Benjamin at King’s College London.
