= Flatpack Film Festival =

UK film festival

- Location: Birmingham, England, UK
- Language: International
- Website: www.flatpackfestival.org

Flatpack Film Festival is a film festival that takes place annually in Birmingham, England. During the festival a varied collection of different films and media forms are shown, including animation, documentaries, short films, music videos and experimental cinema. The annual event was spawned from the year-round antics of 7 Inch Cinema, originally a mixed-media filmnight at the Rainbow pub in Digbeth.

The festival takes place across numerous venues in Birmingham city centre. Major venues to screen films include The Electric, the Ikon Gallery, mac (Birmingham) and Birmingham Museum and Art Gallery.

The Flatpack Film Festival is run by Flatpack Projects, who have offices in Digbeth, a former industrial area of the city that is now Birmingham's art district. The festival is supported by Arts Council England. The current director is Ian Francis.
