= Red Note Ensemble =

Red Note Ensemble is one of the contemporary music ensembles in Scotland, formed by some musicians in the UK. Playing and developing contemporary music, the ensemble performs to audiences around and beyond Scotland. Its current Chair is Emeritus Professor Peter Nelson.

It was partially named for the blue note in jazz, and also refers to the red color that a certain music notation software uses to mark notes that it thinks are out of an instrument's range.

Red Note Ensemble Ltd has been directed since its foundation in 2009 by John Harris (Chief Executive and Artistic Co-Director) and cellist Robert Irvine (Artistic Co-Director). In 2011 international violinist Jacqueline Shave was appointed as the Leader of the Ensemble. The ensemble performs the established classics of contemporary music, regularly commissions new work and has been developing the work of new and emerging composers from across the globe. Featured composers include Scottish-based composers including David Fennessy, Gordon McPherson, Gareth Williams, Sally Beamish and Bill Sweeney and international names such as John Adams, Philip Glass, Arvo Pärt, Toru Takemitsu and James Dillon.

As the most prominent contemporary ensemble in Scotland, Red Note undertakes extensive audience research, in conjunction with St Andrews University, with the aim of finding new ways to attract new audience to contemporary music, including through finding new spaces and exploring new ways of presenting and performing contemporary music.

Red Note debuted in 2008 with a recording of Eddie McGuire’s Carrochan suite for Delphian Records, since then their annual Spring and Autumn season comprises Scottish tours in the major towns and cities as well as more remote areas in the Highlands and Islands. The ensemble is renowned for their site-specific work and collaborations with other companies including 1000 Airplanes on the Roof with the National Theatre of Scotland, Pass the Spoon with Magnetic North Theatre Company and Tantallon! These Lands, This Wall with the Lammermuir Festival in East Lothian. Red Note's regular informal new music series Noisy Nights and Noisy Words, in partnership with the Traverse Theatre in Edinburgh, attract and showcases the work of new composers from Scotland and across Europe.

Red Note is committed to the education sector and has alliances with the Royal Conservatoire of Scotland in Glasgow, at Glasgow University and the Woodend Barn in Banchory, near Aberdeen. Red Note is particularly focused on helping the development of the musical creativity of Primary and Secondary school pupils, as well as performance and composition standards across higher education.

Red Note is Associate Contemporary Ensemble at the Royal Conservatoire of Scotland in Glasgow, and an Associate Company of the Traverse Theatre in Edinburgh.
