= Stéphane Caillat =

French composer and conductor (1928–2020)

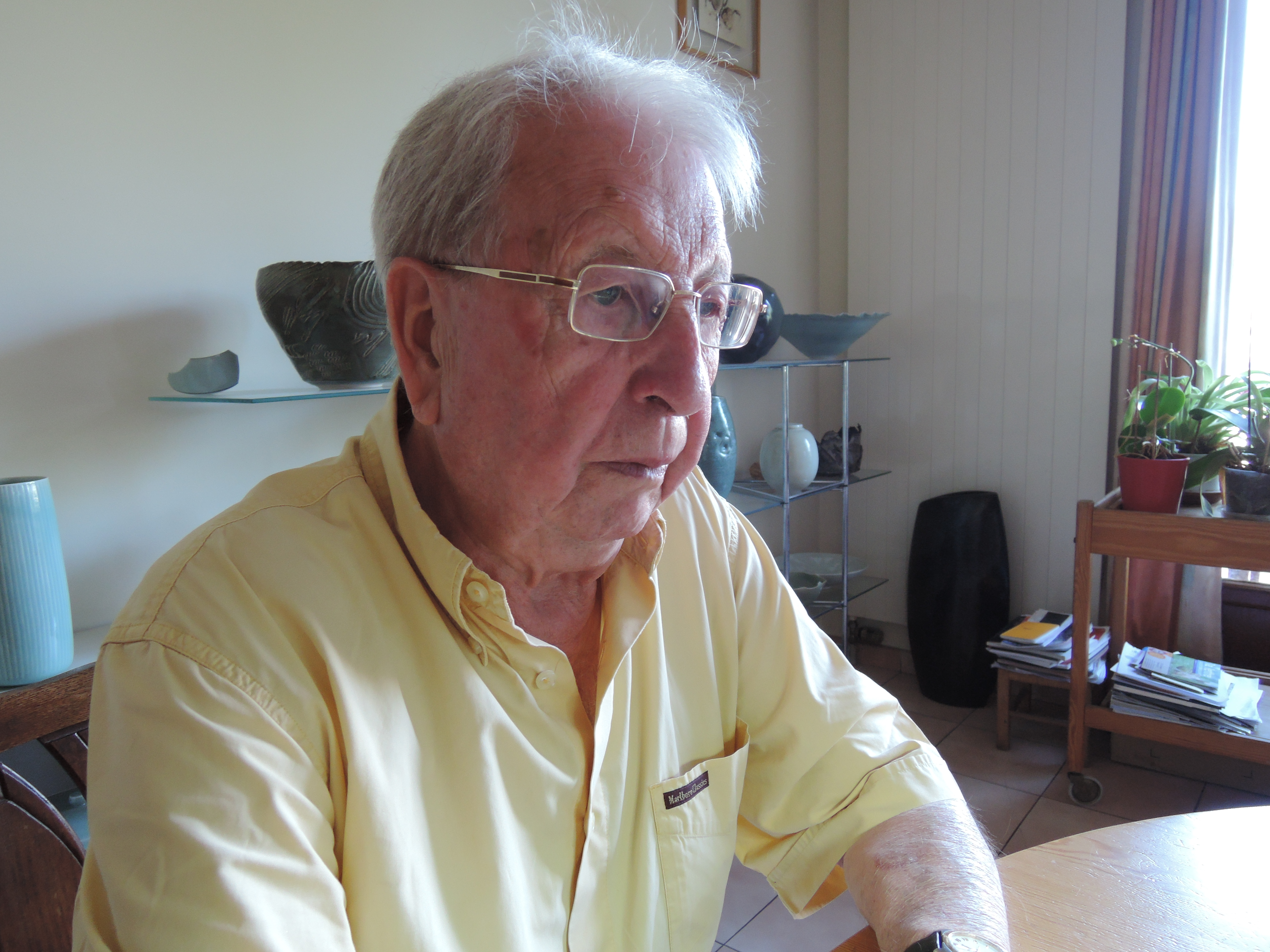
- Stéphane Caillat in 2013
- Born: 1928; Lyon, France
- Died: 11 September 2020 (aged 91–92)
- Occupations: Composer; Conductor

Stéphane Caillat (French: [stefan kaja]; 1928 – 11 September 2020) was a French composer and conductor of orchestras and choirs.

== Biography ==
Caillat studied music in Lyon and Paris, where he studied harmonics, counterpoints, organ, and conducting. In 1954, he founded the choir named after him, Stéphane Caillat. In 1979, he founded the Centre d'études polyphoniques et chorales de Paris Île-de-France, which he directed for ten years. He was also director of the choir Per cantar e sonar and of the Festival d'art sacré de la Ville de Paris. He also produced music programs for France Musique during the 1980s. He helped with the rediscovery of Baroque music and received the Grand prix du disque from the Académie Charles Cros.

== Books ==
- Illuminations, pour chœur (1973)
- Cantique (1974)
- Qui? Quoi? Comment? (1975)
- Ma vie avec la vague (1980)

== Discography ==
- Chansons d'amour (1956)
- Le Requiem de Duruflé (1958)
- Dialogus inter angelos et pastores Judae in nativitatem Domini H 420, In nativitatem Domini canticum H 314 (1962)
- Messe de Requiem
