= List of Romanian musicians =

This is a list of musicians from Romania.

== Classical ==
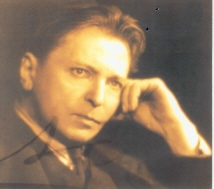
George Enescu

- Filaret Barbu (1903–1984), composer, well known for the operetta Ana Lugojana
- Pascal Bentoiu (born 1927), Modernist composer
- Tiberiu Brediceanu (1877–1968), composer and folklorist
- Nicolae Bretan (1887–1968), opera composer, also baritone, conductor and critic
- Ionel Budișteanu (1919–1991), violinist and conductor
- Eduard Caudella (1841–1924), composer, wrote the first Romanian opera, Petru Rareș
- Sergiu Celibidache (1912–1996), composer and conductor
- Paul Constantinescu (1909–1963), composer, especially of religious and vocal music, also wrote music for Romanian films
- Vladimir Cosma (born 1940), composer, conductor and violinist
- Dimitrie Cuclin (1885–1978), classical music composer, musicologist, philosopher, translator and writer
- Constantin Dimitrescu (1847–1928), composer of Peasant Dance
- Grigoraș Dinicu (1889–1949), composer best known for his violin showpiece Hora staccato
- Sabin Drăgoi (1894–1968), composer and folklorist, one of the pioneers of scientific gathering of Romanian folklore
- George Enescu (1881–1955), composer, violinist, pianist, conductor and teacher
- Valentin Gheorghiu (born 1928), pianist and composer
- Ion Ivanovici (1845–1902), composer of The Danube Waves waltz
- Mihail Jora (1891–1971), "the father of Romanian ballet"; works include Intoarcerea din adâncuri and La piață
- Nicolae Kirculescu (1903–1985), composer of theatre and film music, including the theme of the television programme Teleenciclopedia
- Dumitru Georgescu Kiriac (1866–1928)
- Dinu Lipatti (1917–1950), pianist and composer
- Cristian Matei (born 1977), composer
- Marcel Mihalovici (1898–1985), composer
- Anton Pann (1790s–1854), wrote Romania's national anthem and music for the Orthodox Divine Liturgy
- Ionel Perlea (1900–1970), composer and conductor
- Ciprian Porumbescu (1853–1883), composer
- Doina Rotaru (born 1951), composer of mainly orchestral and chamber works
- Constantin Silvestri (1913–1969), composer, lived in England
- Matei Socor (1908–1980), composer and musician
- Cornel Trăilescu (born 1926), opera composer and conductor
- Anatol Vieru (1926–1998), composer of symphonic, chamber and choral music; winner of Herder Prize in 1986
- Ion Voicu (1923–1997), violinist
- Teo Milea (born 1982), pianist and composer

== Contemporary ==
Some of the most prominent contemporary musicians of Romania:

=== Alternative ===
- Kumm
- Partizan
- The Kryptonite Sparks
- Timpuri Noi
- Urma
- Vunk

=== Avant-garde ===
- Ana-Maria Avram
- Iancu Dumitrescu
- Aurel Stroe
- Octavian Nemescu
- Ştefan Niculescu
- Costin Miereanu
- Octave Octavian Teodorescu
- Horațiu Rădulescu

=== Cafe singers ===
- Jean Moscopol (pre-war singer reminiscent of Carlos Gardel)
- Gică Petrescu
- Cristian Vasile

=== House/Dance ===
- 3 Sud Est
- Activ
- Akcent
- Alexandra Stan
- David Deejay
- Deepcentral
- Deepside Deejays
- DJ Project
- DJ Sava
- Edward Maya
- Fly Project
- Haiducii
- Inna
- Morandi
- Play & Win
- Randi
- Radio Killer
- Tom Boxer

=== Electronica ===
- Mihai Crețu
- Adrian Enescu
- DJ Project
- Octave Octavian Teodorescu
- Shukar Collective
- Sunday People
- Șuie Paparude

=== Folk ===
- Mircea Baniciu
- Dorin Liviu Zaharia
- Ducu Bertzi
- Mircea Florian
- Tudor Gheorghe
- Adrian Ivanițchi
- Florian Pittiș
- Ion Dolănescu
- Dumitru Fărcaş
- Gabi Lunca
- Ion Miu
- Romica Puceanu
- Ileana Sararoiu
- Maria Tănase
- Gheorghe Zamfir
- Fanfare Ciocărlia
- Mahala Raï Banda
- Taraful Haiducilor

=== Psych-folk/world fusion ===
- Dorin Liviu Zaharia

=== Folkloric/Ethnic/World ===
- Ion Dolănescu
- Dumitru Fărcaş
- Gabi Lunca
- Ion Miu
- Romica Puceanu
- Ileana Sararoiu
- Maria Tănase
- Gheorghe Zamfir
- Fanfare Ciocărlia
- Mahala Raï Banda
- Taraful Haiducilor

=== Hip-Hop, Rap ===
- B.U.G. Mafia
- CTC Controlul Tehnic de Calitate
- La Familia
- Paraziţii
- R.A.C.L.A.
- Zale

=== Jazz, Acid jazz ===
- Anca Parghel
- Johnny Răducanu
- Aura Urziceanu
- Harry Tavitian
- Blazzaj

=== Pop ===
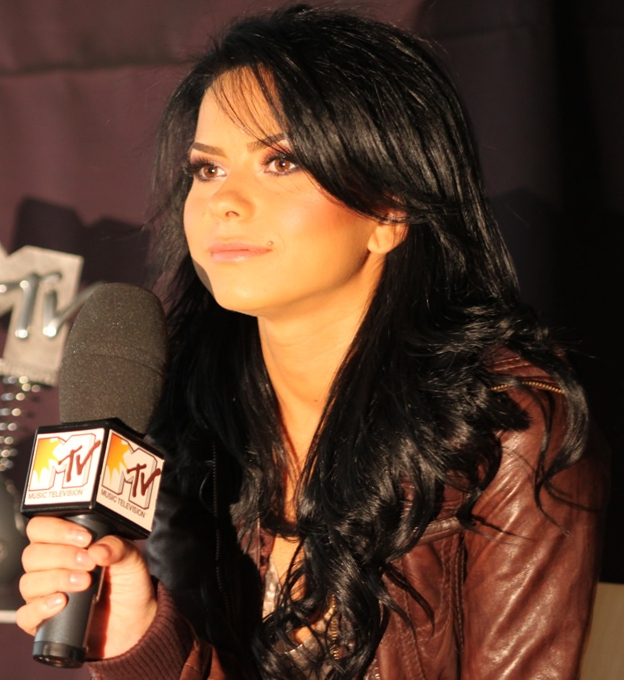
Inna

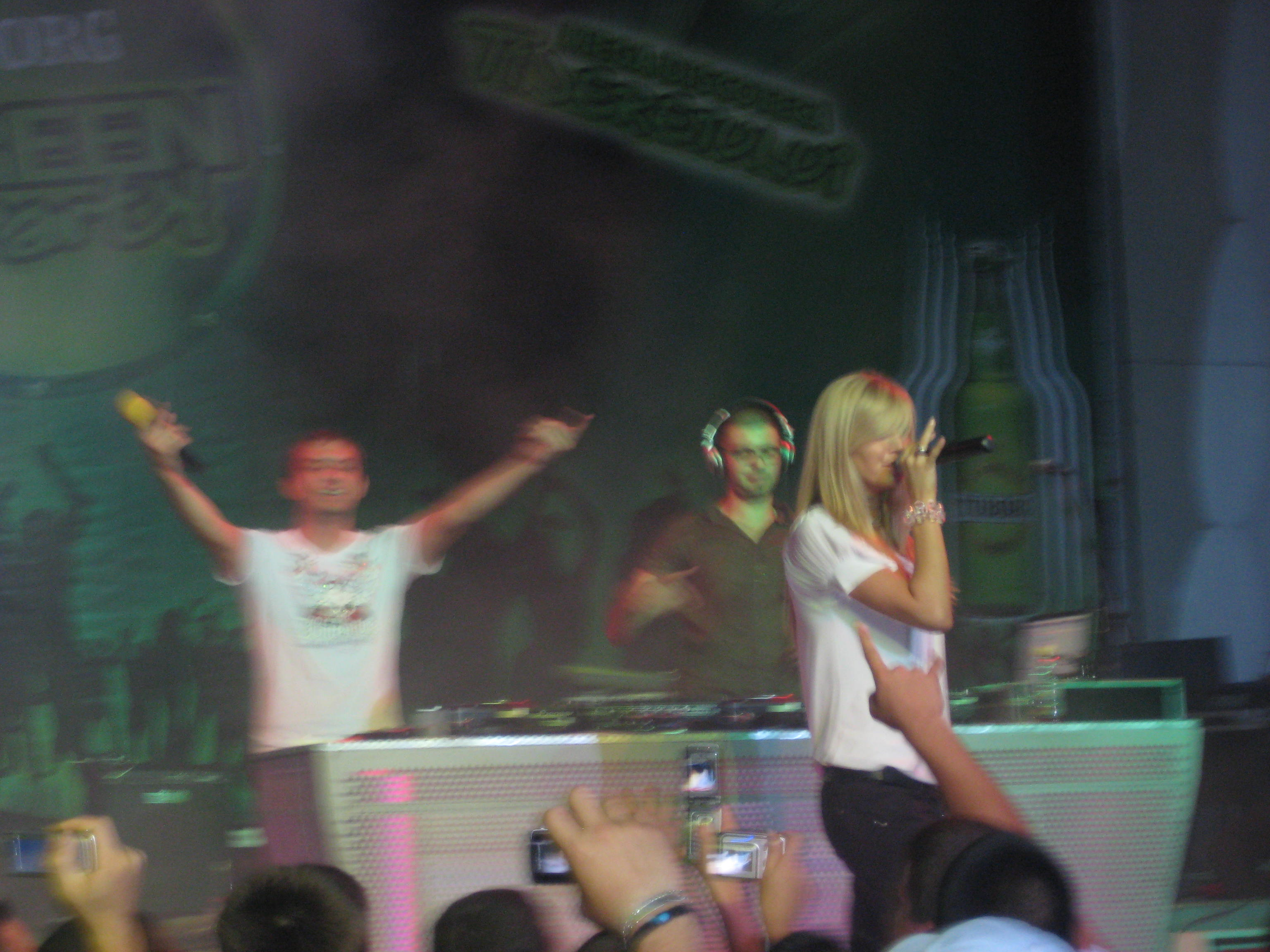
Activ performing in Costinești

- Mihai Trăistariu
- 3rei Sud Est
- Activ
- Antonia
- Akcent
- Serban Ghenea
- Blaxy Girls
- Andreea Bălan
- Ştefan Bănică, Jr.
- The Cheeky Girls
- Razvan Fodor
- Elena Gheorghe
- Hi-Q
- Krypton
- Delia Matache
- Mirela
- Morandi
- Loredana
- Nicole Cherry
- Nicola
- O-zone
- Spitalul de Urgenţă
- Cleopatra Stratan
- Taxi
- Voltaj
- Radu Sirbu
- Inna
- Corina

=== Rock and Metal ===
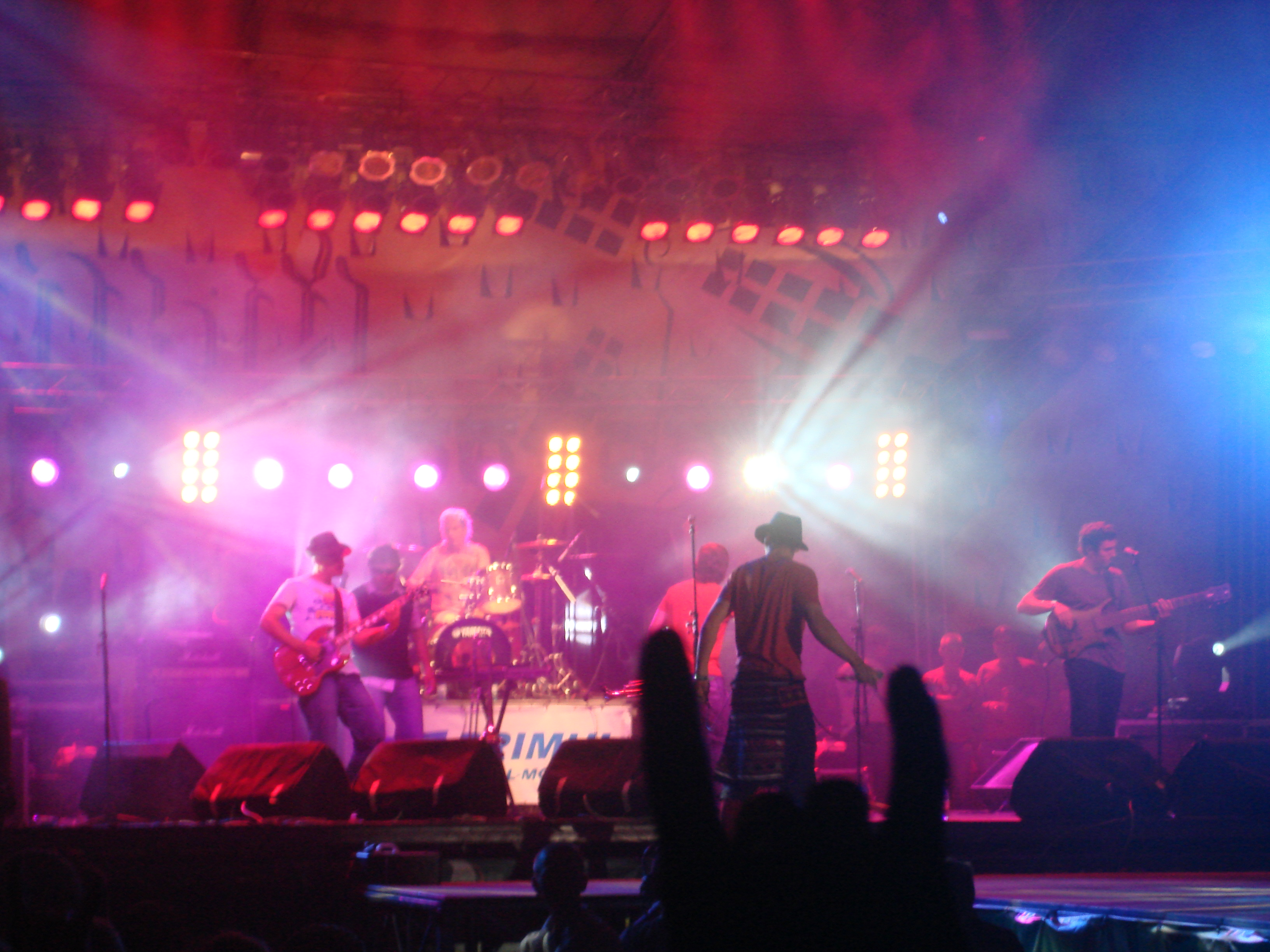
Zdob şi Zdub

- Altar
- Bucovina
- Byron
- Cargo
- Celelalte Cuvinte
- Goodbye to Gravity
- Grimus
- Iris
- Krypton
- Kumm
- Luna Amară
- Magica
- Negură Bunget
- Octave Octavian Teodorescu
- Pasărea Colibri
- Timpuri Noi
- Phoenix
- Trooper
- Transsylvania Phoenix
- Valeriu Sterian
- Vunk
- Zdob şi Zdub

== See also ==
- List of Romanians
- Lists of musicians
- List of Romanian composers
