= Rock music in Romania =

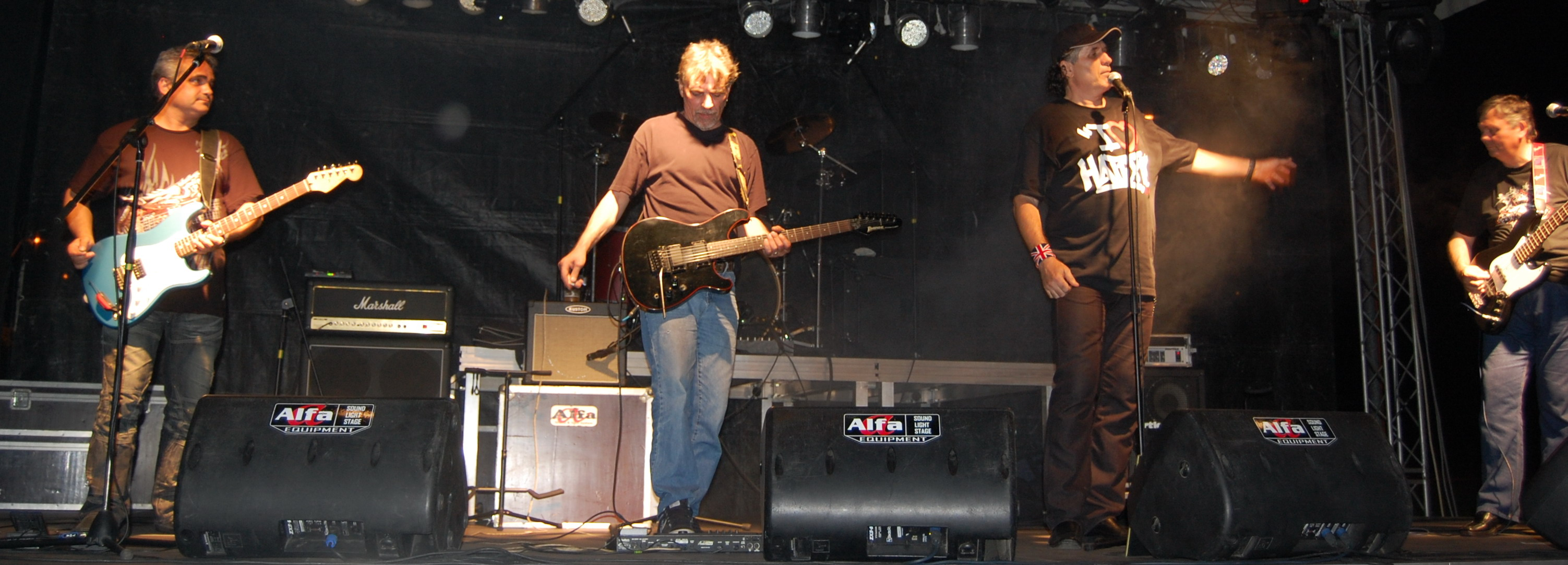
Barock Group

Romanian rock is a genre of popular music in Romania. It was influenced by changes in Romanian politics to such an extreme, that both the themes and styles of musicians, and the tastes and interests of listeners, changed dramatically with every major event in Romania's internal politics.

As a result, the rock music that is currently performed in Romania features a politically influenced profile that equipoised censorship policies in communist Romania (before 1990) and reacted promptly to social issues that followed during the economic transition.

However, the strict government regulations practised in Romania during the Nicolae Ceauşescu era determined a very specific sound in popular music, partly favourable for its originality. Music and new technologies from abroad reached Romanian listeners and artists with difficulty – this was a moderate handicap to music production and sometimes produced slightly unfashionable records (when compared to Western interests). These conditions continued to have a strong influence even on music produced for many years afterward.

== History ==
Rock music, which rapidly gained momentum during the 1960s in communist Romania, was a rather controversial topic, mainly because of the regime's propaganda against Western culture. In 1971, this fear culminated with the famous July Theses. Thanks to its growing popularity, rock music was regulated, but allowed to flourish in Romania, often triggering a generation gap not dissimilar to that of the West or other Eastern European countries.

=== "Electric guitar bands" ===
Rock and roll didn't really gain solid ground in Romania until the early 1960s. During the 1950s, all art forms were highly influenced with proletkult. The 1950s' vogue in music was latin jazz and tango. The music was sometimes thought of as inventive, but it mostly resembled kitsch.

Little is known about the beginning of rock music in Romania; however, some of the earliest artists were: Uranus (founded in 1961, in Timișoara), Cometele (The Comets, 1962, Bucharest), Sfinţii (The Saints, 1962, Timișoara), Entuziaştii (The Enthusiasts, 1963, Bucharest). Such early bands survived for only a couple of years (Except for Sfinţii, who later became Phoenix and is still active), but the musicians carried on playing in other bands, soon to become famous. The rock trend started in Romania with The Young Ones (1961), a feature film starring singer Cliff Richard.

Rock music was actually seldom called by its name in Romania (and in other East European countries); however, the term beat was sometimes used instead (this was also the name of an EPs series, released in the late 1960s). However, rock bands were much more often referred to as "electric guitar bands" (ro. formaţii de chitare electrice). The use of alternative names in the 1960s does not mean that the term "rock" was banned or avoided, but shows that there was a different perspective on the whole phenomenon.

=== Aftermath of the July Theses ===
All through the 1960s, Romanian rock bands were permitted to sing in English or other foreign languages; moreover, covers of Western music were requested by Electrecord itself (the state recording label), to increase disc sales.

In 1971, President Nicolae Ceauşescu delivered the so-called "July Theses" some of whose objectives demanded reorientation of all cultural interests towards national values and treasures. In fact, the July Theses inaugurated a "mini cultural revolution"; the Romanian rock scene was suddenly confronted with many nascent issues that they had not faced before. Singing in foreign languages was now restricted to other Romance languages, such as French and Italian, or to fellow socialist bloc languages.

=== Post-communist era ===
With the disappearance of state censorship after the Romanian Revolution, the Romanian rock scene saw a period of diversification and liberalization. Themes previously considered inappropriate by the authorities could now be explored, and numerous new bands and artists came to prominence.

Music festivals such as Stufstock and Peninsula / Félsziget Festival further helped with the popularization of Romanian rock, including to neighboring countries, such as Bulgaria and Hungary.

In 2011, the first edition of Summer Well Festival took place near Bucharest, on the Ştirbey domain, in Buftea. Thanks to this festival, many indie, brit-pop or electro bands such as The Wombats, Interpol or Chew Lips were promoted and shown to the Romanian public.

== Notable bands ==
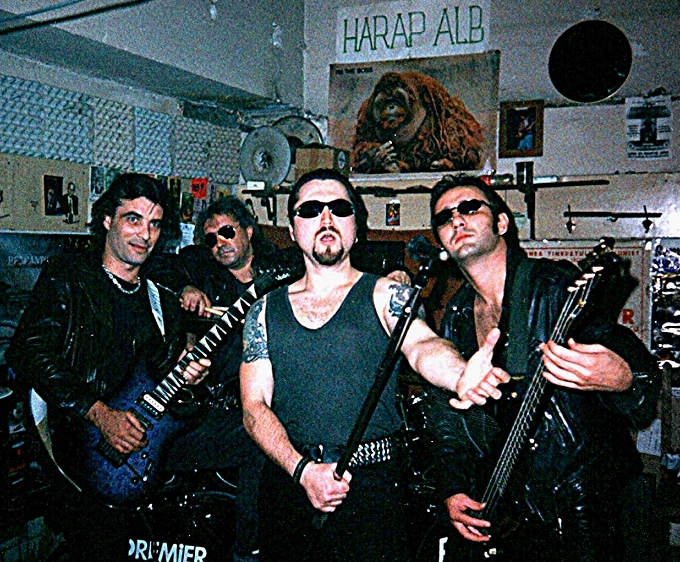
Harap Alb

- Altar
- AP3
- Bere Gratis
- Byron
- Cargo
- Celelalte Cuvinte
- Grimus
- Holograf
- Iris
- Krypton
- Kumm
- Luna Amară
- Magica
- Negură Bunget
- Progresiv TM
- Sfinx
- Taxi
- The Kryptonite Sparks
- Timpuri Noi
- Phoenix
- Trooper
- Urma
- Voltaj
- Vunk

== Romanian rock musicians ==
- Dan Andrei Aldea
- Mircea Baniciu
- Dan Bittman
- Sorin Chifiriuc
- Nicu Covaci
- Mircea Florian
- Josef Kappl
- Ovidiu Lipan
- Teo Peter
- Costin Petrescu
- Valeriu Sterian
- Octave Octavian Teodorescu
- A. G. Weinberger
- Dorin Liviu Zaharia

== Bibliography ==
- Caraman Fotea, Daniela and Nicolau, Cristian (1999). Rock, Pop, Folk Dictionary, Humanitas Publishing House, Bucharest. ISBN 973-28-0910-8
- Ionescu, Doru (2005). Time of Electric Guitars. A Journey Log through the Romanian Television's Archives, volume 1, Humanitas Educational, Bucharest. ISBN 973-689-064-3
- Preda, Caterina (2009). Dictators and Dictatorships: Artistic Expressions of the Political in Romania and Chile (1970s–1989): No paso nada...?, Universal-Publishers, Boca Raton, ISBN 978-1-59942-310-4.
