= Corneliu Stroe =

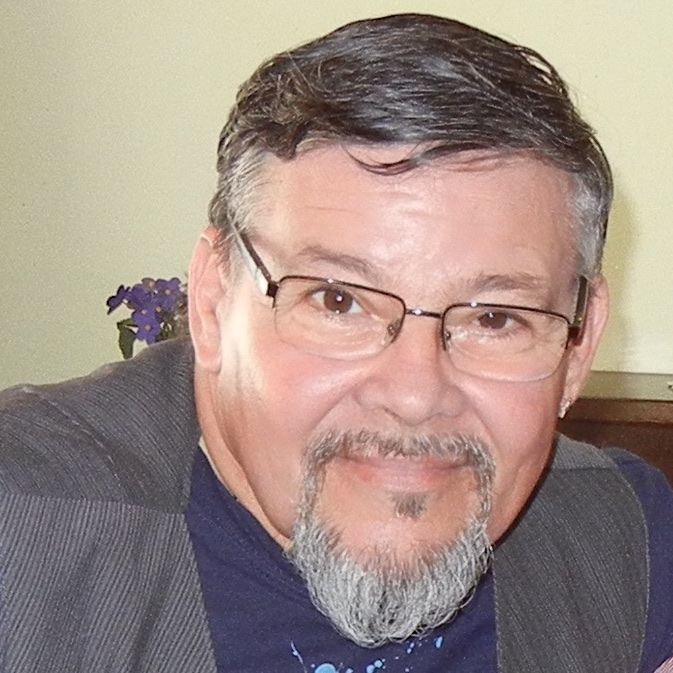

Background information
- Born: October 22, 1949; Bucharest, Romanian People's Republic
- Died: June 11, 2017 (aged 67) Constanța, Romania
- Genres: Jazz
- Occupation: Percussionist
- Instrument: Drums

Corneliu Stroe (22 October 1949 – 11 June 2017) was a Romanian drummer and percussionist.

Born in Bucharest, he moved at the age of 2 to Mediaș, due to his father's job. He grew up there, and later became a member of several local bands, among them Orfeus.

== Creative ==
Between 1981 and 2005 he was a member of Creative, together with Harry Tavitian, with whom he participated in many Romanian jazz festivals, in Sibiu, Galați, Ploiești, etc.

== Other collaborations ==
- Gheorghe Zamfir
- Ovidiu Lipan
- Jazzographics
- Blues Community
- Aromanian Ethno Band; participated in the FMM Sines - Festival Músicas do Mundo, Portugal
- Mike Godoroja & Blue Spirit
- Zig Rag Orchestra of Étienne Brunet
- Corneliu Stroe Balkan Blues Band
- Balkanamera
- Vasile Șeicaru
- Foxy Lady Band
- Direcția 5
- Pasărea Colibri
- Nightlosers
- Mircea Baniciu
- Johnny Răducanu
- Alexandru Andrieș
- A. G. Weinberger

His daughter, Roxana Stroe, is arguably the only female blues guitarist in România.

== Awards ==
- First Prize at the Student Art Festival ("Marele Premiu al Artei Studențești", 1974)

== Discography ==
- Horizons, Leo Records, Londra, 1985 (with Harry Tavitian)
- Transylvanian Suite, Leo Records, Londra, 1986 (with Harry Tavitian)
- Post Communism Atmosphere, Deux ZZ Records, Paris,1984 (with Etienne Brunet)
- Creațiunea, București, 1991 (with Harry Tavitian)
- Roots (with Blues Community) (cassette)
- Visul toboșarului (with Ovidiu Lipan, etc.)
