= Ioan Gyuri Pascu =

Romanian singer, producer, actor, and comedian

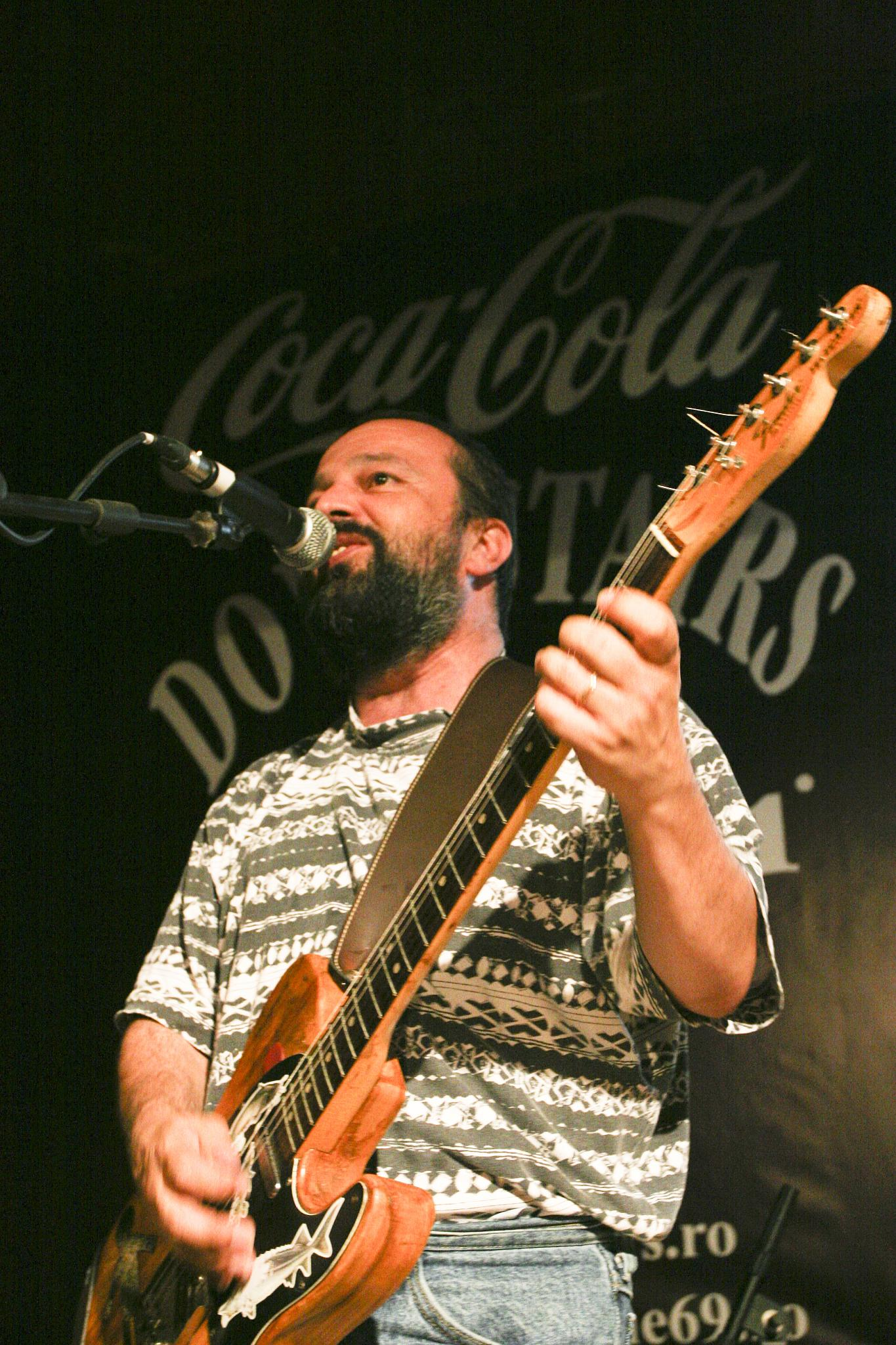
- Pascu jamming with the Nightlosers, June 2008

Background information
- Also known as: Gyuri Pascu; Ghyuri Pascu
- Born: Ioan Ghiurico (Gyurika) Pascu; August 31, 1961; Agnita, Sibiu County, Romania
- Died: September 26, 2016 (aged 55) Bucharest, Romania
- Genres: Rock music, rhythm and blues, jazz, folk revival, folk rock, reggae, reggae fusion, parody music
- Occupations: Musician, comedian, stage actor, film actor, television actor, writer, schoolteacher, restaurateur
- Instruments: Vocals, guitar, acoustic guitar, drums, harmonica, mandolin, piano
- Years active: 1977–2016
- Label: Tempo Music

Ioan Gyuri Pascu (Romanian pronunciation: [iˈo̯an ˈɡjuri ˈpasku]; also credited as Ioan Ghiurico Pascu, Gyuri Pascu, and Ghyuri Pascu; August 31, 1961 – September 26, 2016) was a Romanian pop music singer, producer, actor, and comedian, also known for his participation in the comedy group Divertis and for his activity in Romanian cinema and television. Moving between rock music, rhythm and blues, reggae, and jazz, the multi-instrumentalist Pascu founded a number of bands and registered success particularly during the early 1990s, when he was the lead singer of a group known as The Blue Workers. Pascu was the manager of several alternative music acts with his label Tempo Music and remained an outspoken critic of Romanian commercial radio.

Noted for his impressions and musical acts within Divertis' political satire shows, Pascu was also a successful actor, appearing in film productions such as Lucian Pintilie's An Unforgettable Summer and Cristian Mungiu's Occident, and portraying known characters in Romanian theater in various stage adaptations. He also wrote sports columns and was a writer of Christian literature.

He received an offer from Walt Disney Pictures, and he provided the voice of King Louie in 2006 for the Romanian version of the film, The Jungle Book.

== Biography ==
=== Early life ===
Pascu was a native of Agnita (at the time part of Brașov Region, now in Sibiu County), where he graduated from primary school. He was born to an ethnic Romanian father and a half-Hungarian mother; on his mother's side, he was also the descendant of Poles and Slovaks. His mother was a Roman Catholic and his father, like Gyuri, was a Romanian Orthodox. His name reflects his complex heritage: Ioan was chosen as his Romanian name; his second name was the Hungarian Gyurika, but it was recorded as Ghiurico in his birth certificate and personal documents ever since—as Pascu later indicated, this was because neither his father nor the notary were familiar with Hungarian phonology. Pascu, who was fluent in the Hungarian language, preferred the hypocoristic Gyuri.

Pascu began to study piano when he was nine years old, and sang soprano in his school choir, entertaining his friends with impressions of well-known pop singers. During fifth grade, he started playing handball with an amateur team, discarding piano lessons and contemplating a career in acting. He also taught himself guitar.

At age fourteen, Pascu's voice changed. He was still a soprano in the choir, but had to use his head voice. As a high school student, Pascu had to enlist in the Union of Communist Youth (UTC), the Romanian communist regime compulsory youth organization. In 1976, he enrolled at the Agnita High School, which later became the Agro-Industrial High School. The same year, he gave up handball and began a more formal study of guitar music, using the Maria Boeru textbook as his guide. He debuted as an amateur actor in 1977, with a school theater performance at the Agnita House of Culture.

Pascu was also interested in the Cenaclul Flacăra concerts, an outlet for American folk-inspired and folk rock, tolerated under communism. He became familiar with Western music acts such as Olivia Newton-John and Queen, and active in the UTC's cultural brigade, wrote and performed his first folk-rock numbers.

=== Trandafirii Negri and Fundal ===
In May 1978, Pascu attended an International Workers' Day celebration in Mediaș, where he befriended brothers Septimiu and Horia Moldovan, who were in the same band as pop singer Elena Cârstea. According to Pascu's official site, they played Western rock hits for him, including Deep Purple's "Child in Time" and Uriah Heep's "July Morning". Between 1978 and 1980, Pascu sang with the Moldovans' band Trandafirii Negri, and was invited to perform with them at wedding parties and similar festivities. With the money he earned, he purchased his first acoustic guitar directly from the factory in Reghin, and taught himself to play drums. He composed one of his first published songs, "Melancolie" ("Melancholy"), in 1979.

In 1980, Pascu applied for Târgu Mureș' Szentgyörgyi István Drama School, but failed the entry exam. He worked in a state-owned factory as a lathe operator, and for several months in 1980, was conscripted into the Romanian Land Forces, where he met other amateur musicians who were undergoing military training. Together they founded the rock band Fundal, with Pascu as lead singer and drummer. They performed in the nationwide Cântarea României festival.

In 1982, their military term over, Pascu and Fundal returned to Mediaș, where Pascu was discovered by Romanian Radio's Radio Vacanța station. He was invited to perform at the station's youth concerts, where he met and befriended Teo Peter, bass player for Compact, and music promoter Andrei Partoș. During 1982, Pascu also played Cenaclul Flacăra concerts, and was billed for the UTC's Scînteia Tineretului shows. He later described his mentoring by rock singers Cristi Minculescu, Liviu Tudan, Adi Ordean and Vladi Cnejevici as his "third real school". In 1980, Pascu also discovered and became influenced by reggae music. He was introduced to the reggae style by The Police and its reggae fusion sessions, then became a fan of reggae numbers played by African diaspora students in Romanian universities. Twenty years later, Pascu told reporters: "Between 1980 and 1985, I was mad about Bob Marley."

=== University years and Divertis debut ===
In 1984, Pascu moved to Cluj-Napoca, and was admitted into the Cluj University Faculty of Letters, studying Romanian and Spanish. He had applied for the similar faculty at the University of Bucharest twice, but failed the entry exam. Soon after admission, he joined the university's theatrical company Ars Amatoria și Fiii, mentored by literary critic Ion Vartic. He performed radio comedy and parody theater during this time, and was involved in Vartic's Echinox literary club. Pascu continued his interest in sports, particularly soccer, and was a noted fan of the college soccer team FC Universitatea Cluj.

In 1986, while Ars Amatoria was touring Bucharest with an adaptation of Ion Luca Caragiale's plays, Pascu met and befriended members of the comedic ensemble and student group Divertis, which performed subtle political satire against Nicolae Ceaușescu's communist rule. Pascu had been a Divertis fan since 1982 and recalled, "I met with the Divertis boys after a show. They liked me [and] asked me to join the group". His first performance with Divertis took place in 1987, at Izvoru Mureșului resort in Harghita County. Pascu resumed his musical career, and also in 1987, was invited by Partoș to sing at a summer festival in Deva.

In 1988–1989, upon graduation, Pascu taught Romanian language and literature at a primary school in Ulmu, Călărași County, but gave up to pursue his singing career. Late in 1989, he was in Semenic, where he met Mircea Baniciu, former member of Romania's leading rock band Phoenix (later Transsylvania Phoenix). He was a guest in Baniciu's home just as the anti-communist Revolution erupted in Timișoara. He rejoined Divertis in Iași, but their scheduled show there was broken up by the communist authorities.

With the end of communism, Pascu diversified his career as an entertainer. After performing a solo music recital in February 1990, he renewed his contract with Divertis, and toured the country with them. Later that year, Divertis performed for the first time in a series of comedy shows airing on Romanian Television channels. The group worked with filmmaker and Traffic Police officer Virgil Vochină, adding comedy bits to his serialized road safety campaign, Reflecții rutiere ("Roadside Reflections"). From December 1990 to 1992, Pascu was employed as a program editor by the same station.

In 1992, with Mircea Rusu, Pascu released the extended play recording Ar putea fi ("It Could Be"). In partnership with his girlfriend Daniela Marin, he founded Tempo Music, which claimed to be Romania's first independent music label. Pascu also founded his own band, The Blue Workers.

=== First musical and comedic hits ===
Pascu recalled that during the 1990s, Divertis had to perform dozens of consecutive encores while on tour, which interfered with the group's regular Twin Peaks viewing parties. According to Gardianul newspaper, Pascu's activity with Divertis turned him into "one of the most popular figures in homegrown comedy". In his 2006 interview with Dilema Veche, Divertis founder Toni Grecu recalled that Pascu was notable as the only group member not born in the historical region of Moldavia.

In 1993, Pascu experienced his first significant success in music with the album Mixed Grill and the single "Țara arde și babele se piaptănă" ("The Country Is Burning and Old Women Are Combing Their Hair", referencing a Romanian proverb). A poll conducted by the journal Evenimentul Zilei nominated the track as the best song of 1993, and the nationwide station Radio Contact awarded Pascu its "Composer of the Year" title. Mixed Grill marked Pascu's brief experimentation with a fusion of rock and reggae. Hits such as "Gizzi" and "Mi-am luat colac" ("I Got Me a Lifebuoy") led some to consider him one of the pioneers of Romanian reggae, years ahead of acts like El Negro and Pacha Man. The mix of genres became characteristic of Pascu's work in music: "When I was writing records, I figured that, should someone, say, be playing my record at a party, they would have several kinds to choose from, and they would not grow bored. But it's not because of that, I think that's how inspiration visits me, that this is how I write. I won't stick to any one musical genre." In addition to the piano, guitar and drums, Pascu also began playing the harmonica.

Soon after marrying Daniela Marin in August 1993, Pascu was invited by director Lucian Pintilie to star in his film An Unforgettable Summer, alongside Kristin Scott Thomas, Claudiu Bleonț and Marcel Iureș. Pascu, who referred to filming on location as his mock-honeymoon, received good reviews for his performance.

Over the following years, Pascu and The Blue Workers released two EPs, the rhythm and blues record Mașina cu jazzolină ("The Jazzolin Engine") and Caseta pentru minte, inimă și gură ("The Cassette for the Mind, Heart and Mouth"). Pascu also appeared on a number of comedy recordings released by Divertis, earning Pascu the reputation of a protest song writer. He was inspired by Romanian politics and the social debates of the 1990s to write hits like "Morcovul românesc" ("The Romanian Carrot") and "Instalatorul" ("The Plumber"). Pascu acknowledged his political streak, recognized what he considered the necessary link between social phenomena and a songwriter's cultural perspective, and argued that songs should always tell a story. One of the parody songs included on Mașina cu jazzolină, titled "Africa, Africa", drew special interest in cultural circles with its satirical undertones. The lyrics suggested that modern Romania was no better than the average African nation. According to historian Sorin Mitu, "Africa, Africa" showed "the Romanians' tendency to relate to extra-European realities", a trend he observed during Ceaușescu's final decade, and then throughout the early post-revolutionary period.

In 1995, after a series of festivals where he sang together with The Blue Workers, Pascu had a solo recital at Brașov's Golden Stag Festival, and was awarded the Best Album trophy by the music magazine Actualitatea Muzicală, for Mașina cu jazzolină. He was also the opening act for Western rock groups touring Romania: the British bands Jethro Tull, Beats International and Asia, and Germany's Scorpions. As a television actor, Pascu was also taking part in the development of Romania's advertising industry. He was chiefly remembered in pop culture as the spokesman for Connex, one of the first mobile phone operators in Romania, with the catchphrase Alo, Maria? ("Hello, Maria?").

In February 1997, Pascu released the album Gânduri nevinovate ("Innocent Thoughts"). According to his website, it can be considered as Pascu's "first less commercial record." Pascu's daughter, Ana Iarina, was born later in the same month.

After 1997, Pascu prioritized his activity as a music promoter and producer. Between 1998 and 2000, he and his wife helped launch successful pop and alternative rock acts such as Vama Veche, Domnișoara Pogany and Dinu Olărașu. After releasing the song collection Poveștile lui Gyuri ("Gyuri's Stories") in 1999, he gave up music, stating that he had become disenchanted with newer pop trends, but returned in 2000 with a limited-release record titled Lasă (muzică de casă), "Leave It (Home Music)". As stated on his website, the record registered success with "his closest fans" and with members of the Romanian-American community.

=== From Occident to Felix și Otilia ===
Also in 2000, Pascu began working with filmmaker Cristian Mungiu. He wrote the soundtrack to Mungiu's short film Zapping and appeared with Mircea Diaconu in Mungiu's medium-length film Corul pompierilor. They collaborated in Occident, which featured music composed by Pascu and his supporting role as "Gică", opposite Alexandru Papadopol ("Luci"). This contribution earned Pascu critical accolades. Film critic Alex. Leo Șerban referred to Pascu's "memorable" performance as Papadopol's "cynical, good for all neighbor", and cultural journalist Eugenia Vodă suggested that the "authentic by definition" Pascu added "diaphanous touches" to Mungiu's black comedy.

Two years after Occident's premiere, Pascu released the album Stângul de a visa ("The Left to Dream"), which was less of a commercial success and as Pascu noted, was inconsistent with the editorial policies of commercial radio. According to his website, it was not promoted by the mainstream radio stations, and sold most of its copies during live performances. In a 2009 interview, Pascu argued, "Every time I had songs to pitch, [the stations] would say: 'they're good, but they don't fit in with our policies.' [...] If commercial radio stations were to count, I haven't had put out a record since 1993." He also thanked the file sharing community for circulating copies of his music, even though he lost some royalties. Pascu voiced his opposition to the singing competitions phenomenon, stating that as a one-time member of the Mamaia Festival jury, he had a "bittersweet" experience of Romanian pop politics.

Pascu toured the country to mark the celebration of his 20th year in music, mostly performing in provincial clubs. He continued to give occasional concerts (including as an opening act for Italian singer Albano Carrisi in Arad), and starting in 2003, hosted the musical talk show Taverna on the national television channel, TVR 1. With Divertis, Pascu became a co-host of a regular comedy program on Antena 1, which filmed on location in the United States. He had a recurring sketch on the show titled Felix și Otilea ("Felix and Otilea"), opposite female pop singers Monica Anghel and Jojo, and comedians Cătălin Mireuță and Daniel Buzdugan. He was a voice actor on Animat Planet, a cartoon show produced by Divertis for Antena 1. For these contributions, Pascu was designated "the best comedian of 2003" in a TVR 1 poll.

He released the solo albums O stea ("A Star") and Jocul de-a joaca ("Pretending to Play"), both in 2004. In July 2005, he was invited to sing Brazil's National Anthem at an exhibition soccer match between the 1994 World Cup-winning Brazilian squad and the Romanian team. The same year, he released a greatest hits record, titled 12 ani, 12 balade ("12 Years, 12 Ballads"). Pascu reunited with The Blue Workers for a 2005 nationwide tour and a 2006 performance at the Children's Palace in Bucharest. They appeared at ProEtnica festival in Sighișoara, which celebrated ethnic minorities and the practice of toleration.

Pascu parted with Divertis in 2007. At the time, he indicated that he could no longer handle their tight schedule. The break was not total, though, since Pascu continued to appear on Animat Planet. In a 2007 interview, reflecting on that show's impact, he stated, "I'm not much of a fan of political humor. I simply like the impromptu kind of humor [...]. If [the joke] happens to be political, it is because that is what we have to do in this series." In 2012, he asserted that his break with political humor was definitive, and against the consensus in Divertis—in 2007, Pascu noted there was already a disagreement between him and Toni Grecu. Shortly after his departure, a conflict between Grecu and the other Divertis actors broke Divertis into competing halves.

Pascu released the album La jumătatea vieții ("Halfway through Life") at Cluj-Napoca recital, in November 2007. He resumed his stage career during this time as well. In spring 2007, he starred as Rică Venturiano in an adaptation of Caragiale's O noapte furtunoasă, commemorating the 130th anniversary of the play's first public performance. Pascu appeared in Marius Barna's documentary film Utopia impusă ("Forced Utopia"), which investigated ordinary life in Communist Romania, with singer Dan Bittman, literary critic Ion Bogdan Lefter, actor-politician Mircea Diaconu, and historian Marius Oprea.

=== Writing debut and Pro TV projects ===
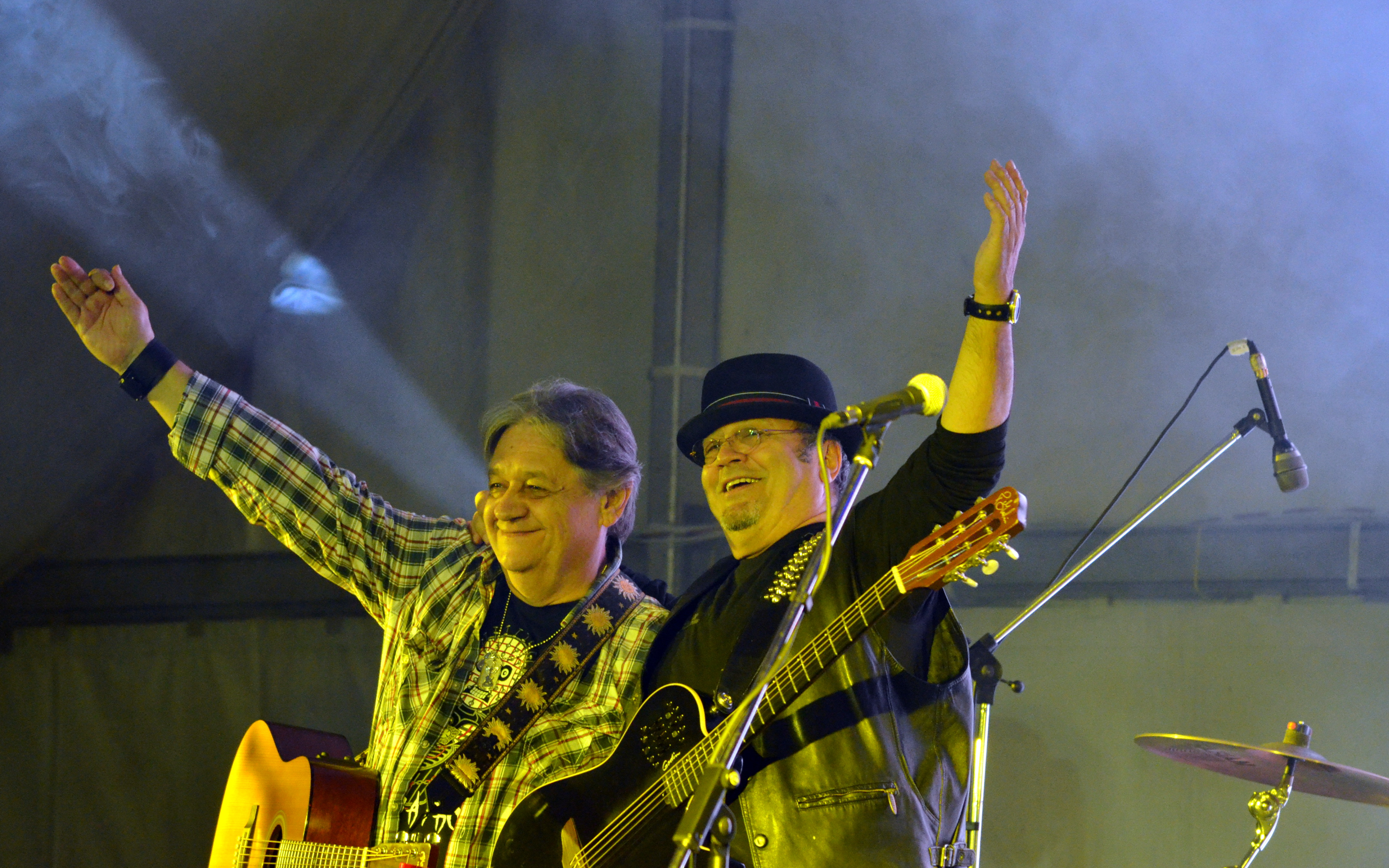
Mircea Baniciu (right) and Mircea Vintilă as Pasărea Colibri frontmen, April 2012

At the age of forty, Pascu began publishing Christian literature, specializing in essays about mysticism. When asked about his beliefs, he declared himself inspired by the Orthodox priest Arsenie Boca and Bulgarian-born New Age mystic Omraam Mikhaël Aïvanhov. In 2007, he said, "We must understand that our destiny, our earthly road, is that of rebuilding the connection with Divinity, with God." Although an Orthodox, Pascu went on pilgrimage to the Roman Catholic Sanctuary of Our Lady of Lourdes.

Pascu was also asked to appear in a Hungarian-produced film, in the role of a Romanian Police officer, and starred in a stage production of Eugène Ionesco's Le Viscomte. He had cameos in television commercials and wrote sports columns in periodicals, including the leisure magazine Time Out Bucharest. In the 2008–2009 season, he played Chief Inspector Fane Popovici in Vine poliția!, a comedy series produced by Pro TV and based on Spain's Los Hombres de Paco. Television critic Cezar Paul-Bădescu called it a "catastrophic" failure.

In April 2009, Pascu provided the comedic intermezzos at UNITER Awards Gala, but his performance received mixed reviews. Three months later, he was the opening act for American folk artist Suzanne Vega at her Bucharest show. Pascu noted that he had honored the invitation only after consulting with his daughter, a Vega fan, and that he adapted his electric guitar songs to the "unplugged" setting, playing the mandolin.

In autumn, he reunited with most of his Divertis colleagues after they moved from Antena 1 to Pro TV. He appeared in a Metropolis Theater production of The Lower Depths by Maxim Gorky, with veteran Ștefan Radof in the lead role. The play opened to good reviews, and Pascu's presence, along with that of other comedic actors (Alexandru Bindea, Tudorel Filimon), was considered an unusual directorial touch to Gorky's tragedy. Pascu and his Blue Workers performed at the Sibiu Jazz Festival. Late in 2009, Pascu and his wife agreed to a divorce.

In April 2010, Pascu sparked criticism in the media when he agreed to perform at a Timișoara rally of Gregorian Bivolaru's Yoga movement (MISA). Bivolaru's legal troubles and allegations regarding MISA's sexual policies were the center of public debates; when contacted by reporters, Pascu stressed that it was a regular gig and stated, "Those people have never harmed me and I have no reason to be avoiding their company." Pascu's activities for that year included other live concerts, including one held during the Bookfest event of June. In November, he was a guest at the Mircea Baniciu tribute concert, entertaining the public with musical impressions of folk singers Nicu Alifantis and Victor Socaciu, and performing Pasărea Colibri classics. Pascu also purchased his own drinking establishment and live music venue, a Bucharest tavern he named Gyuri's Pub, which hosted performances by the Moldovan folk singer Radu Captari. A collaborator of Pascu on solo music projects during spring 2010, Captari sang and played the guitar while riding a horse.

=== 2010 stroke and Divertis split ===
In late 2010, it was reported that Pascu had suffered a stroke and was recovering at the University Hospital of Bucharest. Romania's media speculated that the stroke was caused by the stress of his divorce, although Pascu had stated that the separation was amiable. His career was jeopardized by the stroke, so Pascu decided to quit drinking alcohol. Pascu resumed artistic life, studying for the part of Cadâr in Victor Ion Popa's comedy Take, Ianke and Cadâr. The production went on a tour of Romanian theaters in the early months of 2011.

Pascu returned to Land of Jokes, the comedic series produced by one half of Divertis for Pro TV, where he played the lead character Nemuriciul (a spoof on Highlander: The Series). His return highlighted the conflict between Toni Grecu, who was producing a political comedy show for the same station, and the less politicized Land of Jokes. In June 2011, Pascu and the other Land of Jokes comedians announced that their split with Divertis was final, and that their contract with Pro TV had reached an end. In an interview with Adevărul daily, the freelance comedians announced that they were considering other offers; Pascu criticized Pro TV's focus on producing talent shows. Pascu later acknowledged that he strongly disliked Pro TV features such as Romania's Got Talent, even though his daughter Iarina appeared on it as part of a gospel music ensemble.

The new comedy troupe took the name Distractis, since "the Land of Jokes brand was left with Pro TV", and in August 2011, signed with TVR 1. Media analyst Iulian Comanescu stated about the move, "The [Distractis] program managed a fifth place in ratings. It is the beginning of the end for one of the most upright and best loved brands in Romanian television."

In October 2011, Pascu returned to Cluj-Napoca as a celebrity host for the inauguration of Cluj Arena, home ground of the soccer club Universitatea. He traveled to Seattle and performed at a fund-raiser for a new Romanian Orthodox cultural center in America. In early 2012, he centered his musical activity on Suceava County, working with local singer-songwriter Lian Cubleșan. Their collaboration resulted in the ballad album Tropa, Tropa... €uropa!, released on January 20 at Câmpulung Moldovenesc, where Pascu and The Blue Workers performed a concert. Pascu appeared with his Occident colleague Mircea Diaconu on the short film Loto, playing the role of a car salesman.

== Discography ==
- Ar putea fi (EP, 1992)
- Mixed Grill (studio album, 1993)
- Mașina cu jazzolină (studio album, 1994)
- Casetă pentru minte, inimă și gură (studio album, 1996)
- Gânduri nevinovate (studio album, 1997)
- Lasă (muzică de casă) (studio album, 2000)
- Stângul de a visa (studio album, 2002)
- Prinde o stea (studio album, 2003)
- Jocul de-a joaca (studio album, 2004)
- 12 ani, 12 balade (greatest hits album, 2005)
- La jumătatea vieții (studio album, 2007)
- Tropa, Tropa... €uropa! (with Lian Cubleșan; studio album, 2012)
