= Maria Gheorghiu =

Romanian folk singer and songwriter (born 1963)

- Born: Maria Gheorghiu; August 28, 1963 (age 62); Reşiţa, Romania
- Genres: Folk
- Occupations: Musician, composer, vocalist
- Instruments: Vocals, guitar
- Years active: 1985—present
- Website: www.mariagheorghiu.com

Maria Gheorghiu (born August 28, 1963 in Reșița) is a Romanian folk singer and songwriter. In 1993, she won first prize at the National Festival of Folk Music 'Om Bun' (Good Man).

== Personal life ==
Maria Gheorghiu was born in Reșița, Romania, on August 28, 1963. At the age of three years she started studying ballet. Her artistic gift was inherited from her parents and grandparents. She studied oboe, piano and violin at the School of Music in her hometown, before graduating in 1977. She then joined the choir room "Mioriţa", where she sang for ten years, under the leadership of conductor Doru Morariu. Later, she was a part of the Cenacle Atheneum in Reșița, where she recited poetry. She has a daughter, Maria Cassandra.

== Career ==
Maria Gheorghiu has participated in folk music festivals with artists like Ovidiu Iuliu Moldovan, Ion Caramitru, Ştefan Iordache, Dorel Vişan, Eusebiu Ștefănescu, Valeria Seciu, Anda Călugăreanu, Ducu Bertzi, Daniel Iancu, Nicu Alifantis, Victor Socaciu, Vasile Șeicaru, Mircea Vintilă, Tatiana Stepa, Ștefan Hrușcă, Mircea Baniciu, Ovidiu Mihăilescu. In her early career she was supported by the folk singer Valeriu Sterian. He is also the composer with whom Maria Gheorghiu launched her songs "Maria de Mangop", "Bocetul lui Ioan cel fără de mormânt" and "Uşa ce-o încui". The one who advised her to pursue a musical career was the great actress Leopoldina Bălănuţă and the one who advised her to sing carols was the singer and actress Anda Călugăreanu.

In 1984 she sang at a show for Cenaclul Flacăra. After 1989, she toured France, Denmark, Norway, Greece, Austria. In 1993, she won first prize at the National Festival of Folk Music 'Om Bun' (Good Man).

In 1995, Maria Gheorghiu released her first audio cassette Lacrimi în flăcări (Tears in flames). In 1997 she released the album Canon și Maria Gheorghiu and in 1996, a carols album, Pe la case luminate (On the Lighted Houses). She collaborated with composers Eugen Mihăescu and Adrian Ordean in 1999 to release the album Floare de vârtej (Flower whirlwind), featuring lyrics by Nichita Stănescu, Nicolae Labiş, Adrian Păunescu, Mihai Eminescu, Octavian Paler, Miron Manega, Camelia Radulian.

In 2002, Pe la case luminate was reissued and in 2004 Maria Gheorghiu released the album Timp netrăit (Unlived Time). She performed a recital in Kyiv, Ukraine, in 2006 with the Kyiv Symphony Orchestra, before reissuing the album Floare de vârtej in 2007.

Since 2008, Maria Gheorghiu has held numerous performances with the band Atelier. In most of her appearances on stage, she is accompanied by the pianist Radu Graţianu.

In 2010, Maria Gheorghiu released the album Curcubeu (Rainbow), followed in 2013 by a "Best of" album called De 20 de ani Om bun (20 years of Good Man), which features songs from 1993 and later as well as four new songs.

In 2013–2015, she made numerous appearances on the show Sub zodia Mariei (Under the sign of Mary), with the partners Eusebiu Ştefănescu, Adriana Trandafir, Radu Graţianu, Tomi Cristin and Adrian Păduraru. The show is dedicated to four important women named Maria: The Virgin Mary, the Byzantine princess Maria of Mangup, the Queen Marie of Romania, the singer Maria Tănase.

Maria Gheorghiu has collaborated with Dominique Voquer, Anette Bonneville and Kyiv Philharmonic Orchestra. Besides musical activity, Maria Gheorghiu also moderates radio programs for Radio România and Radio București FM, where she promotes folk music and she writes press articles.

"Folk fără vârstă" project, presented by Maria Gheorghiu, was developed for seven years by Radio Romania and was the subject of some of her shows on Radio Romania București FM. It was held in major colleges and high schools in Bucharest and in some universities. "Folk fără vârstă" shows involves most of the folk singers of the old guard, but also the new ones. The project was organized with the full support of the factory of musical instruments, Hora Reghin.

Maria Gheorghiu was on the jury of many folk festivals, such as Tatiana Stepa from Mizil, Toamna Baladelor (Autumn Ballads), Flori de gheață (Ice Flowers) and MiniStar Cireşar from Bucharest, Acustic Live Festival from Reghin, Dor de Folk (Missing Folk) from Braşov, Fălticeni Folk from Fălticeni.

She is the only singer who plays Ave Maria, composed by Franz Schubert, in Romanian. The text was written by Horaţiu Bena in 1938.

Maria Gheorghiu is the only Romanian singer who dedicated a song to the monarch Queen Marie of Romania. The song is called Inima de la Balcic (Heart of Balchik) and it was composed in 2013 in the seaside resort which the Queen Marie loved very much. The lyrics were written by the poet Miron Manega.

== Influences ==
Early in her career, Maria Gheorghiu was influenced by Joan Baez and Marcela Saftiuc.

She is passionate about fado. The Portuguese singer Dulce Pontes congratulated her for the way she performs Canção do Mar.

== Discography ==
- 1995 – Lacrimi în flăcări – Music Producer, Roton
- 1996 – Pe la case luminate (carols album) – Music Producer, Alpha Sound
- 1997 – Canon și Maria Gheorghiu – Music Producer, Alpha Sound
- 1999 – Floare de vârtej – Music Producer, Intercont Music
- 2002 – Pe la case luminate, reissued – Music Producer, Intercont Music
- 2004 – Timp netrăit – Music Producer, Maria Gheorghiu
- 2007 – Floare de vârtej, reissued – Music Producer, Intercont Music
- 2010 – Curcubeu – Music Producer, Intercont Music
- 2013 – De 20 de ani "Om bun" – Music Producer, Patria Records
- 2017 – Câmp de lavandă – Music Producer, Global Content
