= Pasărea Rock =

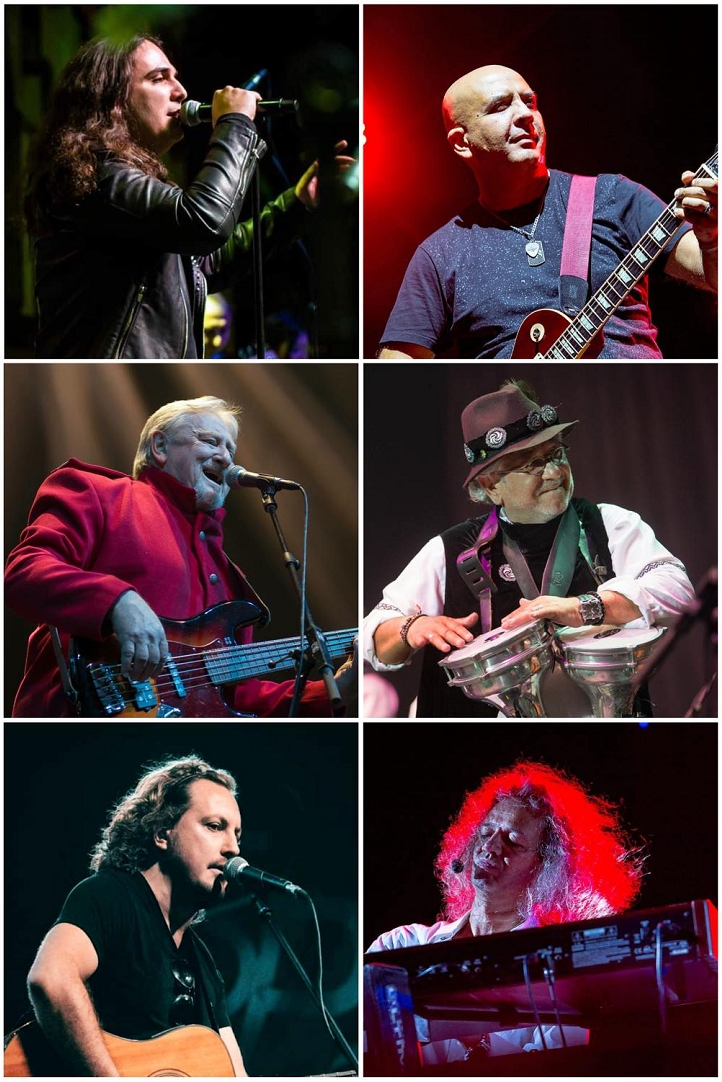
- From top-left, clockwise: Codruț Croitoru, Nicu Patoi, Ovidiu Lipan, Sorin Voinea, Narcis Tran-Korsar, Josef Kappl

Background information
- Also known as: Baniciu, Kappl & Lipan
- Origin: Bucharest, Romania
- Genres: ethno rock; folk rock; hard rock; progressive rock; symphonic rock
- Years active: 2014–present
- Label: Revolver Records
- Spinoff of: Transsylvania Phoenix
- Members: Josef Kappl; Ovidiu Lipan; Sorin Voinea; Nicu Patoi; Narcis Tran-Korsar; Codruț Croitoru
- Past members: Mircea Baniciu; Cristi Gram; Vlady Cnejevici; Teo Boar

Pasărea Rock (English: "The Rock Bird") is a Romanian rock supergroup formed in February 2014, in Bucharest, Romania by three former members of the legendary band Transsylvania Phoenix: Mircea Baniciu (lead vocals), Josef Kappl (bass), and Ovidiu Lipan (drums). The first line-up included another Transsylvania Phoenix member — Cristi Gram on lead guitar — along with Vlady Cnejevici on keyboards and Teo Boar on guitar. Later, they were replaced by Sorin Voinea (keyboards) and Nicu Patoi (lead guitar).

The band's sound is a fusion between modern rock and traditional folk music, along with symphonic elements. Most of the new songs are composed by Josef Kappl; the lyrics are written mainly by Florin Dumitrescu. The setlist of Pasărea Rock also includes a few songs borrowed from Transsylvania Phoenix repertory and from Mircea Baniciu's solo career. In September 2016, Pasărea Rock released its first full-length album: Legenda (The Legend). In December 2020, founding member Mircea Baniciu is replaced by Codruț Croitoru.

== Band members ==
- Josef Kappl – bass guitar, keyboards, vocals, songwriter, leader (since February 2014)
- Ovidiu Lipan – drums, percussion (since February 2014)
- Sorin Voinea – keyboards, programming, backing vocals (since May 2015)
- Nicu Patoi – electric and acoustic guitars (since August 2015)
- Narcis Tran-Korsar – acoustic and double-six guitars, vocals (since December 2018)
- Codruț Croitoru – lead vocals (since December 2020)
- Mircea Baniciu – lead vocals, acoustic guitar (February 2014–December 2020)
- Cristi Gram – electric and acoustic guitars (February 2014–August 2015)
- Vlady Cnejevici – keyboards, programming, backing vocals (February 2014–May 2015)
- Teo Boar – electric and acoustic guitars (February 2014–May 2015)

== Discography ==
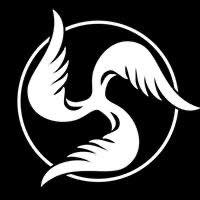
Pasărea Rock official logo

- Pe Argeș în jos (On Argeș downstream) (promotional maxi-single, 2008) ^{1}
- Legenda (The Legend) (promotional maxi-single, 2014)
- Călușandra (The Calusandra) (promotional EP, 2015)
- Legenda (The Legend) (studio album, 2016)
- Cavalcada (The Cavalcade) (studio album, 2021)

Note

- 1 – Released as a maxi-single by Baniciu & Kappl, before the establishment of Pasărea Rock.
