= Ion Buzea =

Romanian tenor

Ion Buzea, sometimes given as Jon Buzea, (born on August 14, 1934) is a Romanian tenor. He had an active international performance career in operas and concerts from the early 1960s until his retirement in 1990. He has since worked as a voice teacher in Zurich, Switzerland.

== Life and career ==
Born in Cluj, Romania, Buzea was initially educated as an engineer with a focus in geology and meteorology. He worked as an engineer while studying to be a singer. He was educated at the Cluj Conservatory where he was a pupil of Lya Pop. He later studied with Petre Ștefănescu Goangă in Bucharest and Luigi Ricci in Rome. In c. 1961 he made his professional opera debut at the Romanian National Opera, Cluj-Napoca as Alfredo in La traviata, and shortly after became a resident artist at the Romanian National Opera, Bucharest.

In 1961 he was a finalist in the George Enescu International Singing Competition, and later won first prize at that competition in 1964. Soon after he won the International Singing Competition of Toulouse, and these competition wins led to contracts with opera houses internationally. For many years he was based out of Vienna, Austria.

In 1966 Buzea portrayed Sir Edgardo di Ravenswood in Lucia di Lammermoor at the Vienna State Opera with Jeanette Scovotti in the title role. That same year he performed the role of Samson to Zanaida Pally's Delilah in Camille Saint-Saëns's Samson and Delilah with the Dublin Grand Opera Society. In 1969 he performed the part of Pedro in a concert version of the opera Tiefland at Carnegie Hall with the American Opera Society, the Waukesha Symphony Orchestra, conductor Otto-Werner Mueller, and soprano Ángeles Gulín as Marta. The same year he portrayed The Duke of Mantua in the Houston Grand Opera's production of Giuseppe Verdi's Rigoletto.

In January 1970 Buzea made his debut at the Metropolitan Opera (Met) as Rodolfo in Giacomo Puccini's La bohème with Gabriella Tucci as Mimì. He appeared at the Met the following month as Cavaradossi in Tosca and Dick Johnson in La fanciulla del West. He was seen at the Met later that year as Aldredo in La traviata with Anna Moffo as Violetta. He returned to Texas for another performance of Rigoletto in December 1970; this time as the Duke to Margherita Rinaldi's Gilda at the Dallas Civic Opera. He performed the same role on tour with the Met in the Spring of 1971 with performances in Boston, Cleveland, and Atlanta. In the summer of 1971 he performed at the Cincinnati Zoo Opera as Edgardo in performances of Lucia di Lammermoor alongside Beverly Sills (as Lucia) and Dominic Cossa. In September 1971 he portrayed Rodlofo at the New Orleans Opera with Anton Guadagno conducting.

Buzea appeared in several operas at the Vienna State Opera in the 1970s; among them the roles of Radames in Aida, Rodolfo, and the title role in Don Carlos. In 1972-1973 he gave performances as Turiddu in Cavalleria rusticana at the Zurich Opera. In 1974 he portrayed the Prince in Boris Godunov at the Royal Opera House in London with Edward Downes conducting. In 1982 he portrayed Don Jose in Carmen at the Zurich Opera with Agnes Baltsa in the title role. In 1984 he performed Cavaradossi opposite Mara Zampieri as Tosca at the Bregenzer Festspiele. He continued to perform until his retirement in 1990 after which he worked as a voice teacher in Zurich.

== Recordings ==
Ion Buzea has made multiple recordings. He appears at the Duke of Mantua in a 1963 complete recording of Rigoletto with the Bucharest National Opera and Chorus led by conductor Jean Bobescu. Originally released on Electrecord, the recording includes Nicolae Herlea in the title role and Magda Ianculescu as Gilda. He also made complete recordings of La traviata (as Alfredo) and Il trovatore (as the Duke of Mantua) with the Bucharest National Opera and Chorus. Buzea has also made television appearances. In 1974 he starred in a Jozsi in a television adaptation of Franz Lehar's Gypsy Love that was broadcast in Germany.
