= Nicu Alifantis =

Romanian singer (born 1954)

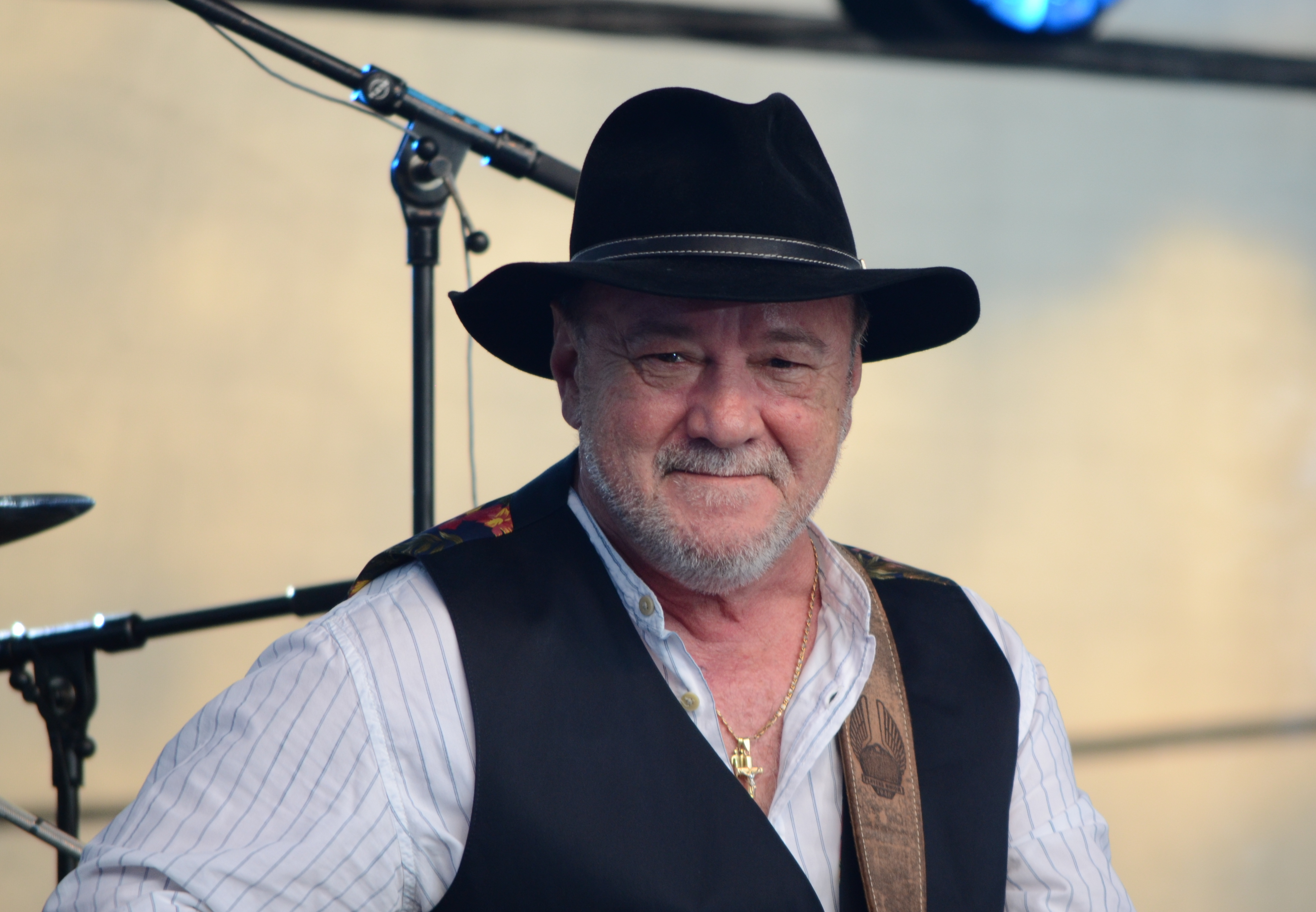
- Alifantis in June 2019
- Born: 31 May 1954 (age 72); Brăila, Romania
- Occupations: Singer; songwriter; actor; poet
- Years active: 1973–present
- Awards: Order of the Crown of Romania (2024); Order of Cultural Merit (2007); Honorary citizenship of Brăila (2017)
- Musical career
- Genres: Folk; Rock; Folk rock; Contemporary folk
- Instruments: Vocals, guitar
- Labels: Electrecord; Toji Productions; Intercont Music; Nemira; Nova Music Entertainment; Alifantis Music
- Member of: Nicu Alifantis & Zan
- Website: Website

Nicu Alifantis (born May 31, 1954) is a Romanian Folk singer, songwriter, stage actor and poet. With an over fifty-year musical career, Alifantis is best known for his discography created with fellow band "Alifantis & Zan" and for his collaborations with other folk bands such as "Pasărea Colibri".

== Biography ==
Nicu Alifantis was born on May 31, 1954, in Brăila to Greek-Macedonian parents. His mother, Evdocsia, was Aromanian, and his father, Menelaus, was Greek. Alifantis studied music privately and made his stage debut in 1973. He was employed in 1975 at the "Maria Filotti" Theater in Brăila and became quite well-known and loved by the public, so that in 1976 the record label Electrecord published his first record material, Cântec de noapte, with four tracks. In the same year, he enrolled in ATM.

After the army, he became a member of the Cenacle Flacăra, led by the poet Adrian Păunescu, and participated in most of the "artistic events", his songs appearing on the compilations Folk 1 and Folk 2 published by Electrecord in 1977 and 1978, respectively. In 1983, at the appearance of the triple LP that marked 10 years of activity of the cenacle, Alifantis is the best represented singer-songwriter on this album, appearing with three tracks.

Between 1973 and 2002 he performed in a total of 4,036 concerts.

In 1995 he founded the group Alifantis & Zan, as a studio band for his album Voiaj. In 1996, after the recording of the Nichita album, Zan becomes a project band with the following members: Virgil Popescu (bass guitar, vocals), Sorin Voinea (keyboards, vocals), Răzvan Mirică (electric and acoustic guitar, sitar, mandolin, vocals ), Relu Bițulescu (drums).

In April 1999, he established the Nicu Alifantis Foundation with the aim of promoting "artistic projects in which value, strength and authenticity will be paramount".

== Discography ==
=== Debuts ===
- debut as a composer in 1972 - "The Storm" by Ostrovsky, "Maria Filotti" Theater, Brăila.
- stage debut in 1973 – Tele Top show, TVR.
- discography debut in 1976 – EP Night song, Electrecord.

=== Songs ===
- Night Song (EP, Electrorecord, 1976)
- After Snails (LP, Electrecord, 1979)
- Nicu Alifantis & Florian Pittiș (EP, Electrecord, 1980) (album made with Florian Pittiș)
- Nicu Alifantis (Typewriter) (LP/MC, Electrecord, 1984)
- Mitică Popescu (LP, Electrecord, 1985; reissued on CD in 2014) (album made with Mitică Popescu)
- Romanian Square no. 9 (LP/MC, Electrecord, 1988)
- The Waster of Love (LP/MC, Electrecord, 1990)
- December (single, Toji Productions, 1992)
- Ia toji balladist (LP, Romtrust & Eurostar & Toji Productions, 1992; reissued on CD/MC in 1998)
- Voiaj (CD/MC, Intercont Music, 1995; reissued on CD in 2011 and 2016) (album made with the band Zan)
- Nichita (CD/MC, Nemira, 1996; reissued on CD in 2011 and 2015) (album made with the band Zan, includes recordings with Nichita Stănescu)
- 25 (CD/2xMC, Intercont Music, 1998)
- The Living Corpse (CD, Toji Productions, 2001)
- Neuitatele femei (CD/MC, Nemira, 2002; reissued on CD in 2006 and 2011) (album made with the band Zan)
- Checkmate (CD/MC, Nova Music Entertainment, 2004; reissued on CD in 2016) (album made with the band Zan)
- Tenderness for women with the 4 lovers (DVD, TVR Media, 2005) (album made with Mircea Baniciu, Mircea Vintilă and Alexandru Andries)
- Simphonicu (2xCD/DVD, Nicu Alifantis Foundation & Nova Music Entertainment, 2005)
- December (CD, Nova Music Entertainment & Unica, 2006) (distributed with Unica magazine)
- Vinyl Collection (4xCD, Intercont Music, 2007; reissued 2014)
- Collected Music, Vol. 71 (CD, Jurnalul Național, 2008) (distributed with Jurnalul Național newspaper)
- Tonight I'm staying at home (CD, Nicu Alifantis Foundation & TVR Media, 2009) (album made with Ștefan Iordache)
- Fireside Songs (CD/LP, Nicu Alifantis Foundation, 2010)
- The Merry Wives of Windsor (CD, Nicu Alifantis Foundation, 2011)
- Mosaic (CD+book, Alifantis Music, 2013)
- Winter Songs (CD, e-media & Click! for Women, 2014) (distributed with Click! for Women )
- Sotron - Vol. I (CD+coloring book, Alifantis Music, 2015)
- Madame Mon Amour (Love songs) (CD, Alifantis Music & e-media, 2016)
- Unopened letters (CD, Nemira & Alifantis Music, 2016) (audiobook read by the author)
- The country where I come from... (CD, Alifantis Music & e-media, 2018) (album made with the band Zan)
- Memorabilia • Theater Music Collection • 45 Anniversary Box Set (8xCD/2xDVD box-set, Alifantis Music, 2018)
- Live at UM 01671 (USB memory stick 8GB, Alifantis Music, 2019) (album made with the band Zan)
- December 50 Collection • Fifty winters over December (CD/DVD box-set, Alifantis Music, 2019)
- Leoneed Is Love (CD+book, Alifantis Music, 2021) (album made with the band Zan)

== Other media ==
=== Filmography ===
Year	Title	Role	Ref.
1980	Bietul Ioanide	Matei Basarab	
1984	Călifar's Mill	Music composer	
1985	Snow Wings	Music composer	
1987	A day in Bucharest	Folk singer	

=== Stage plays ===
Year	Title	Role
1972	Philadelphia ești a mea	Ater Ego
1972	Furtuna	Accordionist
1973	Swanewit	Minstrel
1973	Întîlnirea mea cu Micul Prinț	Balladist
1973	O șansă pentru fiecare	Narrator
1979	Copiii lui Kenedy	Drummer
1980	Șoareci de apă	Balladist

=== Books ===
- Unopened letters joined by 2 epistles by Emil Brumaru and Laurentiu Ulici (Ed. Nemira, 1997) (book relaunched in 2016)
- Alifantis' Dictionary (Ed. Nicu Alifantis, 2014) (book relaunched in 2019)
- Mozaic (Alifantis Music, 2013) (book released together with Mozaic album )
- FaceCarte (Ed. Nicu Alifantis, 2016)
- 45 random poems (Ed. Nicu Alifantis, 2018)
- Between yesterday and tomorrow (poems, thoughts, fireflies) (Ed. Nicu Alifantis, 2020)
- Leoneed Is Love (Alifantis Music, 2021) (book released with Leoneed Is Love album )

== Awards and honors ==
- UNITER Prize for Theater Music (1991)
- Stage Music Award for 'Ubu Rex' with Scenes from 'Macbeth' (1991)
- Constanța Theater Music Award (1995)
- The award for stage music from the show "The Living Corpse" (2002)
- Honorary Citizen of Braila (2017)
- On December 10, 2004, the president of Romania Ion Iliescu conferred on Nicu Alifantis the Order of Cultural Merit in the rank of Knight, Category B - "Music", "for the special contributions to the artistic and cultural activity in our country, for the promotion of Romanian civilization and history".
- On October 22, 2024, the Romanian Royal House conferred on Nicu Alifantis the "Order of The Crown in the rank of Knight" for the special contributions to the artistic and cultural activity

== Interviews ==
- "Ma simt in deplinatatea fortelor mele artistice", Corina Pavel, Formula AS - 1999, no. 348
- "Dupa mine, artistul trebuie sa traiasca nu bine, ci foarte bine, pentru a-si lasa spiritul sa alerge in cautarea inspiratiei", Formula AS - 2002, no. 531
- „Nu imi propun sa fac slagare“. Interviu cu Nicu ALIFANTIS, Svetlana Cârstean, Observator cultural - no. 126, July 2002
- 30 de ani de muzica - Nicu Alifantis, Dia Radu, Formula AS - 2005, no. 657
- Nu mă simt vinovat - interviu despre Cenaclul Flacăra, 16 January 2005, Cristina Ologeanu, Jurnalul Național
- Nicu Alifantis: Casatoria nu e un act de caritate, 22 November 2007, Alice Nastase Buciuta, Revista Tango
- Iubirile unui trubadur - Nicu Alifantis, Bogdana Tihon Buliga, Formula AS - 2010, no. 920
- Nicu Alifantis: „Acum îmi doresc cel mai mult să plec din țară“, 9 June 2011, Sînziana Boaru, Adevărul
- INTERVIU Nicu Alifantis: „M-am cerut în armată ca să scap de medicină“, 1 December 2012, Laurențiu Ungureanu, Adevărul
- Nicu Alifantis: „De foarte multe ori, muzica există în text“, 23 August 2013, Corina Vladov, Ziarul Metropolis
- UN OM CÂT TOATĂ ISTORIA MUZICII | Nicu Alifantis, interviu de Mihai Căsălean, 3 June 2021
