= Josef Kappl =

Romanian-German bass player (born 1950)

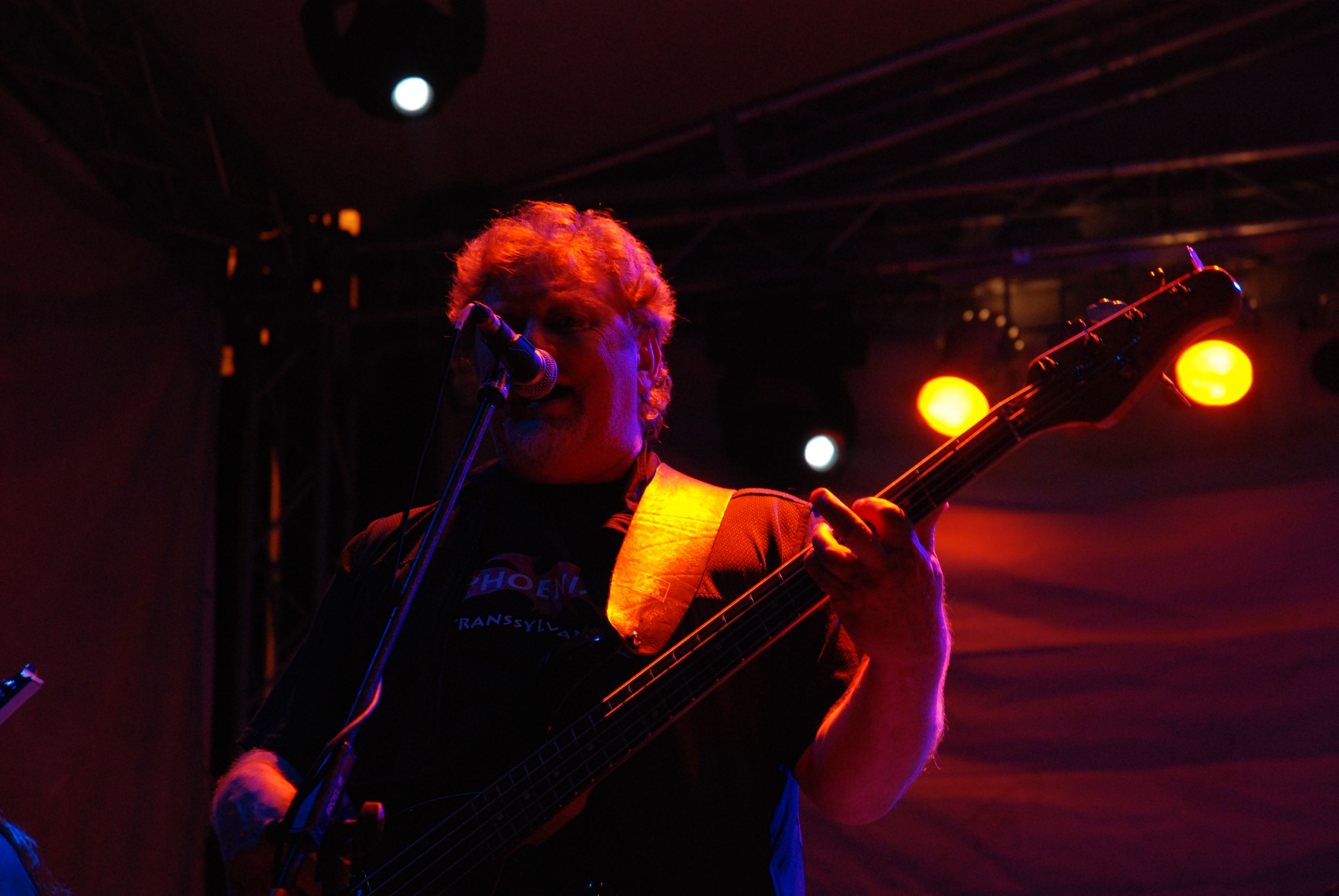
- Born: 15 January 1950 (age 76); Petrila, Hunedoara County, Romania
- Other names: Ioji, Joschi, Jo
- Citizenship: Romania; Germany
- Occupations: Musician, composer

Josef Kappl (born 15 January 1950) is a Romanian-German multi-instrumentalist and singer-songwriter who is best known as one of the oldest members and bass players in the Romanian rock band Phoenix, initially performing with this band in Communist Romania starting from 1971 up until 1979.

Born in Petrila, Hunedoara County, Romania in an ethnic German family (of Austro-Bavarian origin), Kappl was the bass player as well as one of the main members of the Romanian rock band Phoenix during the 1970s.

He graduated from the Music Conservatory in Timișoara, Banat. He also played the violin and the recorder during his time with Transylvania Phoenix.

In addition to his career with Transylvania Phoenix, Ioji is also a former member of the German rock bands Lake and Verstärkung.

With respect to his most recent developments in his musical career, in November 2013, a symphonic rock opera he composed, Meșterul Manole, had its premiere in Timișoara. In 2014, he formed the supergroup Pasărea Rock (The Rock Bird), together with Mircea Baniciu and Ovidiu Lipan.

Nowadays, his residence abroad, in Germany, is in the town of Osnabrück in the land of Lower Saxony.

== Gallery ==
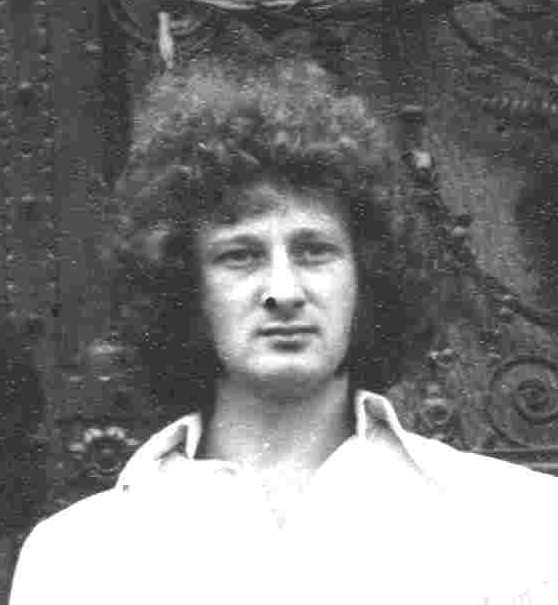
Josef Kappl with Trannsylvania Phoenix (c. 1972–1973)

== Awards ==
- Officer of The Cultural Merit" Order of Romania (Ordinul "Meritul Cultural" în grad de Ofițer, categoria D - "Arta spectacolului")
- MTV Lifetime Award
