= Valeriu Sterian =

Romanian folk and rock musician

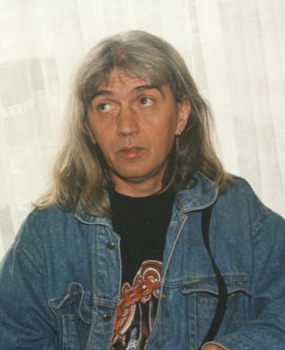
- Valeriu Sterian in 1998, at the release of Ilie Stoian's album Bestiar

Background information
- Born: Valeriu Octavian Sterian; 21 September 1952; Știubei, Buzău County, Romania
- Died: September 16, 2000 (aged 47) Bucharest, Romania
- Genres: Contemporary folk, rock, folk rock, hard rock, progressive rock, pop rock, country, blues, jazz
- Occupations: Musician, singer, songwriter, sound engineer, television host
- Instruments: Vocals, guitar, drums, percussion, harmonica, violin, piano, keyboards
- Years active: 1969–2000
- Labels: Electrecord, Compania de Sunet, Metropol Music, Eurostar, Roton, Fundația Culturală Phoenix

Valeriu (Vali) Sterian (Romanian pronunciation: [vaˈlerju steriˈan]; 21 September 1952, in Știubei, Buzău County – 16 September 2000, in Bucharest) was a Romanian folk and rock musician.

== Studies ==
He studied at the University of Bucharest and obtained a BA in psychology.

== Musical activity ==
Valeriu Sterian started as a drummer during secondary school in the music band Copiii Florilor (Flower Children). His official debut was in 1973 at the Ballads' Spring Festival (Festivalul Primavara Baladelor) (where he received the Best Song Award for the single Nopți (Nights). At that time he was performing with Carmen Marin as Vali și Carmen.

He played for many years within the Cenaclul Flacăra. In 1979 he founded a music band called Compania de Sunet (Sound Company), with which he toured all over the country and also in Bulgaria, Hungary, USSR, Poland, Norway, France, United Kingdom, and in the United States.

In 1993 he founded a record company called B'Inișor ("Pretty well"). He collaborated with other Romanian musicians, such as: Alexandru Andrieș, Nicu Alifantis, Doru Stănculescu, Maria Gheorghiu.

== Personal life ==
In 1999 he was involved in a road traffic accident on Gheorghe Magheru Avenue in Bucharest in which two people were killed. He was arrested on 4 October on suspicion of homicide and driving under the influence of alcohol.

Within a month he was bailed and died of cancer the following year.

== Discography ==
- Cu iubirea de moșie/Cântec de oameni – With the Love of Homeland/Song for People (single, Electrecord, 1977)
- Antirăzboinică – The Antiwar One (studio album, Electrecord, 1979)
- Veac XX – Century XX (studio album, Electrecord, 1982)
- Nimic fără oameni – Nothing Without Beings (studio album, Electrecord, 1989)
- Nopți – Nights (single, Norsk Plateproduksjon, Norway, 1990)
- Vino, Doamne! – Come Down, Saviour! (studio album, Compania de Sunet & Metropol Music, 1991)
- S-a votat Codul penal – The Criminal Law Is Now Enforced (studio album, Compania de Sunet & Eurostar, 1992)
- Evenimentul zilei... și altele – Daily News... and Much More (studio album, Compania de Sunet, 1994)
- Rugă – The Prayer (studio album, Compania de Sunet & Roton, 1998)
- The Very Best of Valeriu Sterian (compilation, Fundația Culturală Phoenix, 2000)
- Din darul magilor 5 – In memoriam Valeriu Sterian (tribute album/compilation, Fundația Culturală Phoenix, 2000)
- Muzică de colecție, Vol. 66 – Vali Sterian (compilation/reissue, Jurnalul Național, Compania de Sunet & Electrecord, 2008)
