= Progresiv TM =

Progresiv TM was a Romanian rock band from Timișoara. The band, set up in October 1972, was first called Classic XX, adopting the name Progresiv TM (being inspired by Locomotive GT) in April 1973.

The starting formula included vocalist Harry Coradini (real name Harald Kolbl, born February 20, 1944, in Timișoara), guitarist Ladislau Herdina, bassist Zoltan "Zoli" Kovacs, drummer Helmuth "Hely" Moszbruker, and keyboardist Ştefan Péntek.

In 1975, Kovacs was replaced by Ilie Stepan and the group received two new members: Mihai Farcas (drums, percussion) and Gheorghe Torz (flute).

In September 1975, Progresiv TM, composed by Coradini, Herdina, Stepan, Moszbrucker, Farcas, and Torz, released their first LP, Dreptul de a visa (The Right to Dream).

In September 1976, the band broke up. Coradini and Herdina, reformed the band with three members of Bucharest rock band, Roșu și Negru (Red and Black): Liviu Tudan (bass guitar, piano, voice), Florin Ochescu (solo guitarist) and Dumitru Bădilă (drums). Subsequently, Dumitru Bădilă was replaced by Ion Cristian "Călare" sau "Pasarila " (drums, voice). They released Puterea muzicii (The Power of Music) in 1979. It is considered a forerunner to the progressive rock.The band broke up shortly after. Coradini left the country, and Herdina returned to Timișoara, where he later re-established the group in 1983 with a hard rock sound instead of a heavy-prog one.

== Discography ==
=== Studio albums ===
- Anotimpuri/Amintiri (Electrecord, 1974, single)
- Dreptul de a visa (Electrecord, 1976)
- Puterea muzicii (Electrecord, 1979, with Roșu și Negru)

== Band members ==
- Harry Coradini (vocals) (1972–79)
- Ladislau Herdina (guitar, vocals) (1972–83)
- Helmuth Moszbruker (drums) (1972–76)
- Zoltan Kovacs (bass) (1972–75)
- Ilie Stepan (bass) (1975–76)
- Ştefan Péntek (organ) (1972–76)
- Gheorghe Torz (flute) (1975–76)
- Mihai Farcaş (drums) (1975–76)
- Liviu Tudan (bass, piano, vocals) (1976–79)
- Florin Ochescu (guitar) (1976–79)
- Dumitru Bădilă (drums) (1976)
- Ion Cristian (drums, vocals) (1976–79)
