= Zale (band) =

Romanian hip hop group

- Also known as: Zale Connection
- Origin: Bucharest, Romania
- Genres: Hip hop, Dancehall
- Years active: 2004–2010; 2019–
- Labels: Zale
- Formerly of: Morometzii, R.A.C.L.A., Paraziţii
- Members: raku, J. Yolo
- Past members: DJ Christu

Zale (Romanian for "chainmail") is a hip hop group from Bucharest, Romania.

raku began listening to hip hop, practicing and MCing in 1993–1994. His first live appearance was in Berceni, Bucharest, and his first discography appearance in 1997; after leaving Morometzii, he became a member of the R.A.C.L.A. crew. In 2000 and 2001 he was invited by the band Paraziţii to record songs with them. In 2003, raku was invited by Cheloo from Paraziţii to perform on his solo album, Sindromul Tourette. In 2004 the video "Egali din naştere" (Born Equal) signed Ombladon (Paraziţii) and featuring raku was a big success at the MTV Europe Music Awards. In 2004 raku and Ombladon won the Best Romanian Act Award in Rome.

== Discography ==
=== Studio albums ===
- Chei Verbale (2005)
- Respect (2007)
- Locos (2019)

== See also ==
- Romanian hip hop
