= Harry Tavitian =

Romanian jazz pianist and singer (born 1952)

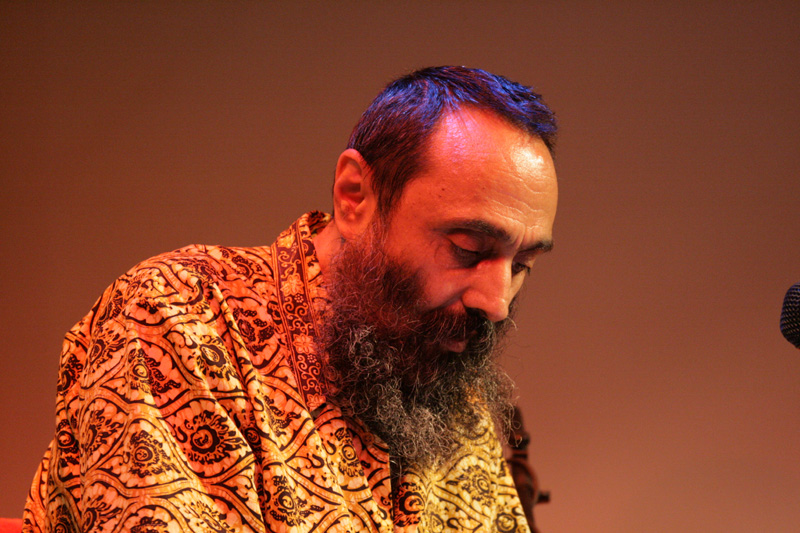

Background information
- Born: 11 August 1952 (age 74); Constanța, Constanța County, Romanian People's Republic
- Genres: Free-jazz; Blues; Ethno-jazz; Avant-garde jazz
- Occupation: Musician
- Instruments: piano voice flutes

Harry Tavitian (born 11 August 1952) is a Romanian jazz pianist and singer, whose style covers free-jazz, blues, ethno-jazz and avant-garde.

Tavitian was born in Constanța to Armenian parents. After attending the Mircea cel Bătrân High School in his native city, he graduated from the Academy of Music in Bucharest. He came to prominence in 1978–1987, when he set up a jazz club, organizing recordings and listening sessions where he presented albums by some of the world's most prominent jazzmen. The club was hosted by Constanța Library, where he was working at the time.

He plays piano solo, as well as with the Orient Express septet and with the Black Sea Orchestra. Creativ is the duo formula with Corneliu Stroe (drums and percussion).

Musicians he performed with over the years include: Johnny Răducanu, Cserey Csaba, Mihai Iordache, Anatoly Vapirov, Alexander Bălănescu, Edi Neumann, Hanno Höfer, Ivo Papasov, Jürg Solothurnmann, Wolfgang Puschnig, Hans Kumpf, Floros Floridis, Jimi El Lako, and Mario Florescu.

== Discography ==
- Open End (Stuttgart, 1984, with Hans Kumpf)
- Horizons (London, 1985)
- Transylvanian Suite (London, 1986)
- East-West Creativ Combinations (Bucharest, 1988)
- the Creation (Bucharest, 1991)
- There's Always a Hope (Sofia, 1993)
- Black Sea Orchestra (Athens, 1998)
- Axis Mundi (Bucharest, 1999) – with Orient Express
