= Electrecord =

Romanian record label

- Founded: 1932
- Genre: Various
- Country of origin: Romania
- Location: Bucharest
- Official website: www.electrecord.ro

Electrecord is a Romanian record label which was founded in 1932 being a major company in the field of music production in Romania, particularly popular for the large number of LPs released on the Romanian music market.

Among the musicians who have recorded at Electrecord, we can mention: Constantin Silvestri, Radu Lupu, Romica Puceanu, Gabi Luncă, Dona Dumitru Siminică, Fărâmiță Lambru, Silvia Marcovici, Virginia Zeani, Marin Constantin, Corul Madrigal, Lola Bobescu, Maria Tănase, Gică Petrescu, Sviatoslav Richter, David Oistrah, Carlo Zechi, Li Ming Qiang, Aldo Ciccolini, Phoenix, Valeriu Sterian, Iris, Compact, as well as many other valuable performers of local fiddle, jazz, rock or folk music.

== History ==
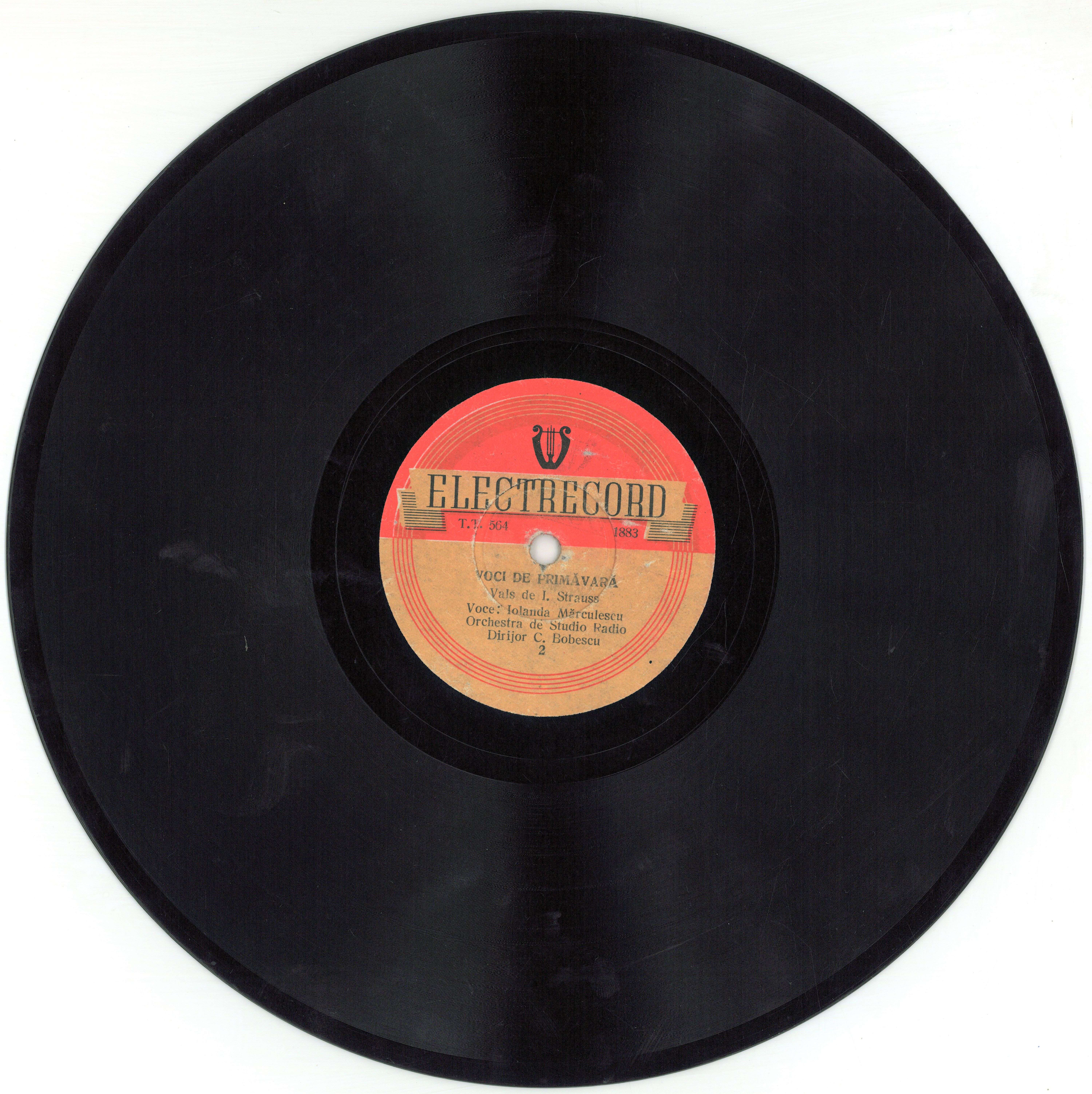
Early Electrecord disc

In 1932, Jewish merchant Nathan Mischonzniki purchased some old equipment from Germany, brought it to Bucharest, and put it into operation. The new record factory was named "Electrecord".

Until 1937, not having its own studio, the factory dealt with duplicating and multiplying records from abroad, with any Romanian recordings being made abroad, at the German company "Kristall". That year, the first recordings were produced with its own means.

During 1939 - 1940, the circulation of the records amounted to about 70 thousand annually. The company offered its services to the Radio, the Ministry of Propaganda, the Society of Romanian Composers, the local branches of the "Columbia" and "Odeon" houses, as well as to companies wishing to have their audio advertisements printed.

In 1948, the company was nationalized, after which its equipment and technologies were modernized. The circulations increased, and in 1956, vinyl records appeared, in parallel with ebonite plates . In 1967, the company switched to exclusive printing on vinyl records and a pseudo- stereophonic recording method was put into practice (sometimes the orchestra was assigned to one channel, and the voice to the other).

The seventies are characterized by recordings of improved quality ( but poor [ citation needed ] compared to Western productions ), as well as by monthly circulations of tens of thousands of copies. Recordings were now made in the studio that would later be called "Tomis", after the former cinema that was located in that building. In 1973, the first stereo discs appeared, but also compatible with mono pickups . In the eighties, the annual circulation reached 6–7 million copies.

Foreign versions of some records, with the lyrics sung in English, as well as audio cassette editions, began to be produced . The year 1983 brought a new modernization of the production line, with equipment being brought from Sweden.

=== Contemporary ===
Beginning in 1990, Electrecord lost market share as record companies formed and the establishment of CDs. But some of the groups who recorded for the label continued. Most discs released by Electrecord after 1990 were either greatest hits albums extracted from older recordings or remastered versions of LPs.

The company found itself in a deadlock around 1996, when production stagnated due to lack of demand, but two years later it was saved by the purchase of its equipment by a British company for $40 thousand and by the sale of the building in which the factory was located. With this money, a high-performance recording studio was purchased.

Following this change, the company's activity was refocused on reissues and recordings. The CDs produced are multiplied in Romania, Hungary or England. Today, the monthly circulation of CDs does not exceed a few thousand copies. In 2002, "Electrecord" had a turnover of (equivalent to) 2.16 million RON and a gross profit of 105,000 RON. In 2003, the company's employees took over the majority stake in "Electrecord" (59.76%) from the state.

In June 2017, Electrecord released the album Songbird by pop singer-songwriter NAVI. Electrecord went into insolvency in 2018. A new start with a new corporate concept followed in 2020.

The last released by Electrecord album was in December 2022 - the CD album Se schimb ceva by the Romanian pop-singer Beni Mihai.

== Roster ==
- Dan Andrei Aldea
- Theodor Andrei
- Alla Bayanova
- Mircea Baniciu
- Pascal Bentoiu
- Lola Bobesco
- Florin Bogardo
- Constantin Brăiloiu
- Tiberiu Brediceanu
- Ion Buzea
- Celelalte Cuvinte
- Sergiu Celibidache
- Elena Cernei
- Marin Constantin
- Paul Constantinescu
- Viorica Cortez
- Gabriel Cotabiță
- Nicu Covaci
- Dimitrie Cuclin
- Hariclea Darclée
- Grigoraș Dinicu
- Gil Dobrică
- Ion Dolănescu
- Sabin Drăgoi
- Iancu Dumitrescu
- George Enescu
- Adrian Enescu
- Dumitru Fărcaș
- Ionel Fernic
- Mircea Florian
- Tudor Gheorghe
- Loredana Groza
- Nicolae Herlea
- Magda Ianculescu
- Iris
- Mihail Jora
- Nicolae Kirculescu
- Krypton
- Ovidiu Lipan
- Dinu Lipatti
- Fanica Luca
- Radu Lupu
- Silvia Marcovici
- Ion Miu
- Horia Moculescu
- Octavian Nemescu
- Ștefan Niculescu
- Irina Odăgescu
- Anca Parghel
- Margareta Pâslaru
- Ionel Perlea
- Valeria Peter Predescu
- Gică Petrescu
- Phoenix
- Progresiv TM
- Romica Puceanu
- Johnny Răducanu
- Mihaela Runceanu
- Ileana Sărăroiu
- Sfinx
- Constantin Silvestri
- Dan Spătaru
- Tatiana Stepa
- Valeriu Sterian
- Vasile Șirli
- Maria Tănase
- Octave Octavian Teodorescu
- Mircea Tiberian
- Timpuri Noi
- Cornel Trăilescu
- Cristian Vasile
- Sofia Vicoveanca
- Anatol Vieru
- Ion Voicu
- Livia Lupu
- Ioana Petran
- Vasile Cănănău
- Gheorghe Zamfir
- Virginia Zeani

== See also ==
- List of record labels
