= Octave (musician) =

Romanian musician and composer

Octavian Teodorescu Octavian Teodorescu
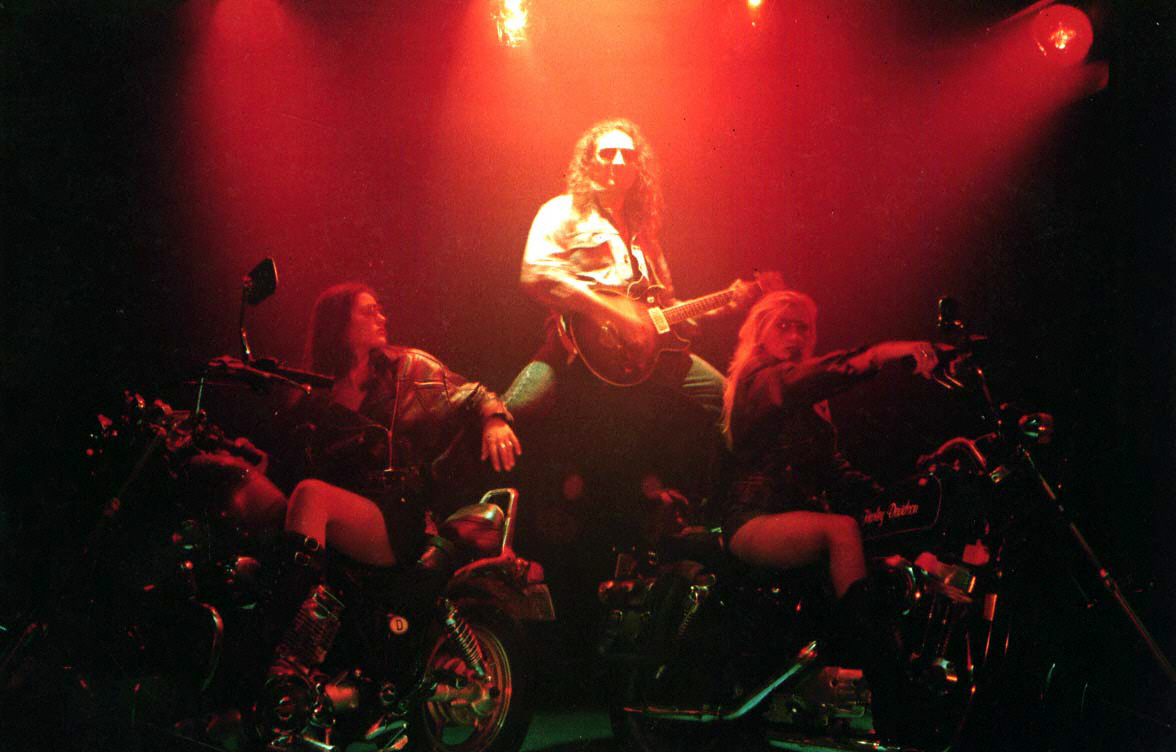

Background information
- Also known as: Octave
- Born: 29 January 1963 (age 63); Bucharest, Romania
- Genres: Rock, electronic, symphonic rock, instrumental, heavy metal, progressive rock, new wave, psychedelic rock, AOR, avant-garde
- Occupations: Musician, composer Guitarist, Keyboarder; Orchestrator, arranger songwriter, Record Producer
- Instruments: Guitar, Keyboards, Programmable Instruments
- Years active: 1988–2001
- Label: Electrecord

Octavian Teodorescu (born 29 January 1963), known professionally as Octave, is a Romanian musician, composer, songwriter and producer from Bucharest, Romania. He is a pioneer of electronic music and the use of computers and synthesizers in music in Romania, with a science fiction touch. He also plays guitars, keyboards and programmable instruments.

His first mainstream success was the 1992 album The Secret of Pyramids, followed by At The Gates of Love in 1993 and Sweet Freedom in 1994. The whole work (102 minutes) appeared unified on a double CD (the first of this kind in Romania) in 1995.

== History ==
=== Early life, influences, first contact with rock ===
He was attracted as child to all kind of instruments and music generally. His parents noticed that, but did not encourage him along this line. When he was 16 he attended his first rock concert: Suzi Quatro 1979 Live in Bucharest. The impact was tremendous for Octave like teenager and this kind of artistic achievement – Rock – will become the landmark of his future artistic career.

The effect was one year later augmented by his 1979 encounter with The Last Waltz, the movie of Martin Scorsese. The film presented as a farewell concert of "The Band" was perceived by him like an homage to the whole generation who in the 70's brought Rock at its height. The Atmosphere of the movie and especially the words of The Band's guitarist, Robbie Robertson, profoundly resonated in the consciousness of the future Octave.

In many of his biographical narrations is pointed this moment when he understands that rock means more than music. He begins to perceive it "like a way of being, of thinking, of social behaviour, of conceiving life itself, a philosophy which by far could not accommodate what he at the time was taught in school under the cultural isolation of the communist regime".

=== 1980 ===
In 1982 he was drafted. He took along his guitar. Rigid military rules and the lack of freedom provoke him all the more to dream the day when he would come back home and would create his own band. That day came in June '83. Afterwards he became a student at the Bucharest Institute of Buildings, which he abandoned after two years to become a professional musician.

In November 1985 he founded his first group and play only in small clubs Soft Rock bearing influences from bands like Eagles or Dire Straits. After a short time the group disintegrated and from then on he performed under the name Octave.

=== 1990 ===
After the Romanian Revolution in December 1989 he is dedicated to instrumental music only, his major idea being to compose a Rock Opera: The Octave Trilogy. In June 1992 the first contract with the Electrecord Label for the first part of the Trilogy was signed. On 27 August the same year, was released the album "The Secret of Pyramids".

=== 2000 ===
Since 1997 is among the first Romanian artists who declared his intentions to be online.

On 15 April 1999, he launched the CD-ROM "www.octave.ro Free Online Music" which includes his career in multimedia format: all the musical material from his albums in MP3, videoclips in MPEG, photos, texts in five linguistic variants (Romanian, English, French, Italian, German) representing among others the stories of the albums, biography, scanned selections from press and fans letters. The CD-ROM points the total move in Multimedia. From that point on, Octave wanted to be found anywhere but by Internet. The CD-ROM was a hybrid one. There were presented like bonus two tracks from a forthcoming album The Only One

Because of the low acceptance of the Romanian public at those times regarding the internet, the whole project fails and remained unreleased but retrospectively looked, it was an important step for the ones who full used this new communication form later. The project was an open door to the future

The CD-ROM contained a text written by Octave called "Multimedia Pleading" which proved now looking back the novelty spirit of this project. And extract from this text:

"It is a new field, which is born nowadays, and we would define pretty clear its final forms not far than the following years. For a better understanding of Multimedia phenomenon let's extrapolate the things through artistic field. Imagine, for instance, that in near future you will not be able listening to the music without watching pictures or reading a story, all three of them having a common concept and being in a closer interdependence. It is like you are a musician, a painter and a poet in the same time; a sort of Leonardo da Vinci."

Since 2001 he has lived in Germany.

== Discography ==
=== Studio albums ===
- 1992 – The Secret of Pyramids (27 August) LP Vinyl Electrecord Label ST-EDE 04168
- 1993 – At The Gates of Love (3 December) LP Vinyl Electrecord Label EDE 04287
- 1994 – Sweet Freedom (15 September) LP Vinyl Electrecord Label EDE 04324
- 1995 – Octave Trilogy (24 March) 2CD Electrecord Label ELCD 153
- 1996 – They Used To Call Him The Dreamer (20 November) Electrecord Label EDC 200
- 1999 – The Only One (unfinished – 2 tracks available on the hybrid CD-ROM) Electrecord Label CD-ROM-OCT

=== Singles ===
- 1993 – There Is One More Step To Climb (16 September) Vinyl Electrecord EDC 10803(extract from the LP: At The Gates Of Love)

=== CD-ROMs ===
- 1999 – www.octave.ro Free Music Online (15 April) Electrecord Label CD-ROM-OCT

== Considerations about the artistic orientation ==
Cristian Botez defined in 1991 in "Momentul" newspaper Octave's music as: "a terrible sound and an avant-garde rock, located at the crossroads of the styles hard rock, new wave, progressive, heavy and symphonic rock. With a compact sound of large coverage, at the same time with melodic passages, easy to remember" Florin Filimon from Fan Radio Bucharest said about the song "The Eyes Of The Planet" from the album "The Secret Of Pyramids" in 1992: "It is a composition that comes with easiness from the classic patterns which our ears are normally accustomed, announcing a long-awaited widening horizons of Romanian musical creation and not only. You are carried from the symphonic music to the metallic one, the result being a cosmic melody, creator of the image of the infinity"

Ciprian Tanasescu mentioned in a review from 1992 of the album "The Secret Of Pyramids" in "Săptămâna" magazine concerning the same composition "The Eyes Of The Planet": "The somewhat exotic sonorities of the song prepare us for what's coming. Alternating the riffs of the guitar with the instrumental melodic lines overlaid with a visible (or perhaps I should say audible) tendency to grandiose." The same author made reference to Octave's sound in another article in the same magazine defining it as an "adjusting of the melodic fluency of the rock from the early '70s to the '80s modern sonorities, the result leading to the emergence of a rock music genre that differs from the current inland rock like a natural pearl between the cultured ones."

In a statement of the release of the album "The Secret Of Pyramids" from 1992 Octave's style was defined as follows: "A unique sound and a mix of styles converge to a rock of the future that ingeniously interlaces the electronic music with the classical one." The same article relates about the song "The Eyes Of The Planet": "The first track on side A of the LP entitled "The Eyes Of The Planet", cumulates all the components of a beautiful dream, showing frequent and amazing changes of tempos and styles, wiggling back and forth between the symphonic orchestration and the metallic warmth of the hard rock"

Florian Pittiș said at the launching of the album "At The Gates of Love" in 1993: "Octave creates sometimes the impression that he seeks to outline a dream-music, a music that can be taken as a drug, a music that calls image" Corneliu Băran described in the article "With Moțu and Octave" from the "Azi" newspaper the musical material of the album "Sweet Freedom" from 1994 in the following way: "The LP contains six "heavy" compositions of amplitude, and I would say – of an expressive tone and as melody – of an exceptional instrumental refinement"

Each Octave album has a story. On the covers of the albums and on the booklets of the CD's is a synoptical storyboard which is constructed from the names of the songs and philosophical ideas signed by Octavian Teodorescu. Cătălin Andrei made reference in 1995 to the philosophical concept behind Octave's music in an article in the "Ziua" newspaper with the occasion of the release of the double compact disc that includes the entire trilogy: "Octave albums – a blend of philosophy, music and science fiction. To understand Octav you need to accept the integration into his philosophical concept. Because his songs are full of seductive traps, which can stun you so much that you become forever "octavomaniac"."

Ema Ofițeru spoke in an article from "Cotidianul" newspaper in 1999 about the "special note" of the music of the artist like being perceived as "a very present and original one".

Mihaela Dordea mirrored Octave in an interview with the artist in 1999 as a composer with a "visionary thinking", with a melos "come from other worlds" that sends a "clear pacifying message".

Daniela Caraman Fotea also summarize in the "Pop Folk Rock Remix" musical lexicon from the year 2003 Octave's musical message to the words: "peace, harmony, spiritual purifying" against a background of "generous themes".

== Bibliography ==
=== Books ===
- Rock Pop Folk Remix – Musical Lexicon – Humanitas Publishing, ISBN 973-50-0355-4, Year: 2003 (Authors: (Daniela Caraman Fotea, Cristian Nicolau) (in Romanian)
- Rock Pop Folk Remix – Musical Lexicon – Humanitas Publishing, ISBN 973-50-0355-4, Year: 2003 Page: 408 (Authors: Daniela Caraman Fotea, Cristian Nicolau (in Romanian)
