= Celelalte Cuvinte =

Romanian rock band

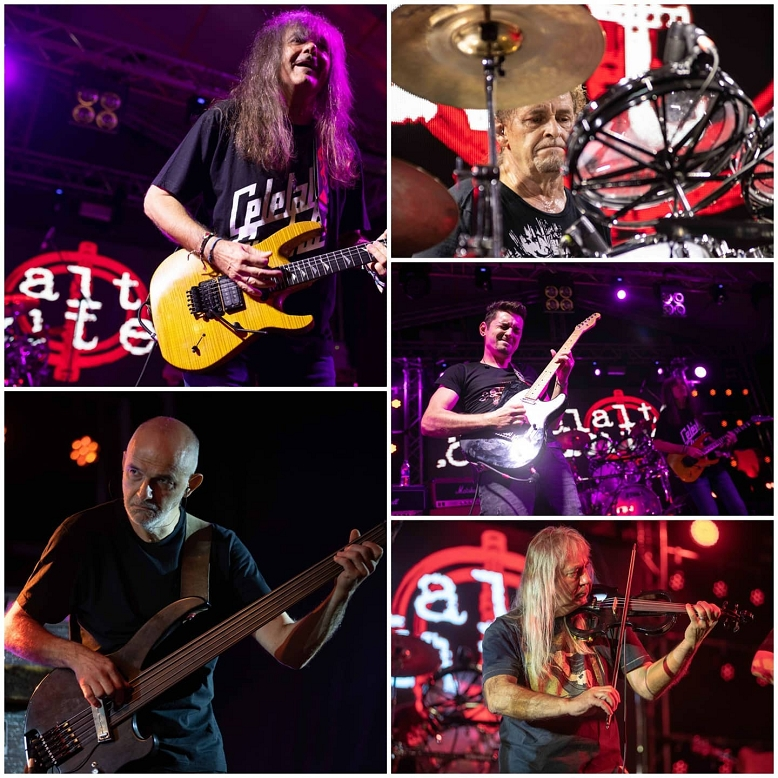
- From top-left, clockwise: Călin Pop, Leontin Iovan, Marius Pop, Ovidiu Roșu, Marcel Breazu

Background information
- Origin: Oradea, Bihor County, Romania
- Genres: Progressive rock; progressive metal; hard rock; folk rock; ethno rock; alternative rock; heavy metal; thrash metal; doom metal; jazz fusion
- Years active: 1981–present
- Labels: Electrecord; Toji Productions; Eurostar; Studio Recording Soft System; Vivo; Zone Records; Intercont Music; ProMusic Productions; TVR Media; Soft Records; Universal Music România; Roton; Loud Rage Music; Trei Bețivi
- Members: Călin Pop; Marcel Breazu; Leontin Iovan; Marius Pop; Ovidiu Roșu
- Past members: Tiberiu Pop; Radu Manafu
- Website: Official Facebook page

Celelalte Cuvinte (English:The Other Words) is a Romanian rock band formed in December 1981 by Călin Pop (lead vocals, lead guitar, and blockflöte/recorder), Marcel Breazu (bass guitar, backing vocals), and Leontin Iovan (drums), while they were still students at the Politehnica University of Timișoara in Timișoara, Banat, south-western Romania.

The initial name of the band was "Sonic" when they were still performing as university students and they were one of the most favourite musical acts of Florian Pittiș who also had an important and proactive role in endorsing them to larger audiences. The first concert of the band took place on 13 December 1981 at the Students' House in Timișoara. In 2021, the band celebrated 40 years of musical activity with an online concert scheduled on the digital platform vStage on 18 December.

== History ==
Formed in Timișoara, while the members of the band were students there. Having won a couple of song-contests and being invited to various festivals, the band was signed to the state-owned record Electrecord label and managed to release 4 songs on the B-side of one of the company's "Formații rock" compilations in 1984.

After finishing their studies in 1987, the group moved back to their native Oradea, and managed to release their first LP "Celelalte Cuvinte I".

Following the release of "Celelalte Cuvinte II", they headed to a heavier direction, leaving behind their old school progressive rock sound and opting instead for a more aggressive style, influenced by heavy metal and thrash metal, while still maintaining a progressive edge. This heavy sound was far more pronounced on the studio album "Armaghedon" which was released in 1994. In addition, the band had also expressed alternative and even doom metal sounds throughout the mid to late 1990s.

By the early 2000s, the group had returned to their progressive rock sound, but in a more modern alternative rock-inspired direction, still maintaining Călin's distinct high-pitch vocal style. In addition, after touring the country for decades, the group had released its first live record, a double CD entitled "Electric Live" in 2019. Most recently, a new studio album entitled "Clepsidra fără nisip", has been announced to be released for the autumn of 2022. In this regard, two new tracks, more specifically the eponymous "Clepsidra fără nisip" (i.e. 'The hourglass without sand') and "Aproape cerul" (short version) have already been released on Youtube on 26 November 2021.

== Band members ==
- Călin Pop – vocals, guitar, blockflöte/recorder (since 1981 onwards)
- Marcel Breazu – bass guitar, backing vocals, songwriter (since 1981 onwards)
- Leontin Iovan – drums (since 1981 onwards)
- Marius Pop – guitar, backing vocals (since 2020 onwards)
- Ovidiu Roșu – sound engineer and occasionally violin (since 1981 onwards)
- Tiberiu Pop – keyboards, backing vocals (from 1986 to 2020)
- Radu Manafu – guitar, backing vocals (from 1981 to 1996) died 2026

== Discography ==
- Formații rock 8 (Rock Bands 8) (split LP, 1985) (tracks were republished on the Celelalte Cuvinte I CD in 2006 and 2017)
- Celelalte Cuvinte I (The Other Words I) (LP/MC, 1987) (republished on CD in 2006 and 2017)
- Celelalte Cuvinte II (The Other Words II) (LP/MC, 1990) (republished on CD in 2006)
- Se lasă rău (Evil is Coming) (LP, 1992)
- Hit-uri (Hits) (MC, 1994) (compilation)
- Armaghedon (Armageddon) (CD/MC, 1994) (republished on CD in 2007 and 2014, and on vinyl in 2021)
- Vinil Collection (Vinyl Collection) (CD/MC, 1996) (contains most tracks from the first three LPs)
- Ispita (The Temptation) (MC, 1997) (remastered and republished on CD and online in 2020, and on vinyl in 2022)
- NOS (CD/MC, 2004)
- Stem (CD, 2008)
- Un sfârșit e un început – Muzică de colecție, Vol. 69 (CD, 2008) (compilation published with Jurnalul Național)
- Trup și suflet – Live acustic la Cinema Patria (Body and Soul – Acoustic Live at Cinema Patria) (CD/DVD, 2014)
- Electric Live (2CD/online streaming, 2019) (recorded at Sala Palatului in Bucharest, 8 December 2011)
- Lumea asta (This World) (CD/2LP/online streaming, 2022)
