= A. G. Weinberger =

Romanian musician

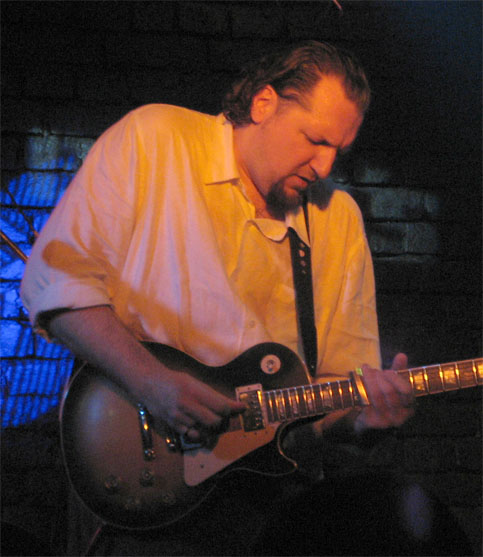
A. G. Weinberger

AG Weinberger is a blues/jazz/rock guitar player, lapsteel guitarist, bandleader, vocalist and record producer born in Oradea/Nagyvárad, Romania.

Weinberger wrote scores on 30 theatre plays for Romanian theatre companies (including L.S. Bulandra Theatre, the Romanian National Theater, the State Jewish Theater, the National Theater Marin Sorescu Craiova).

== Discography ==
- Good Morning, ‘Mr. Blues ! (1996)
- Standard Weinberger (1997), this album earned the recognition of the Romanian Composers and Musicologists Union, which has never formally recognized the blues genre, awarding it “Best Jazz Album of the Year” in 1997.
- 1600 Transylvania Avenue (1999)
- The Transylvanian Blues Man (2003)
- Nashville Calling (2006)
- Guitar Man vol. 1 & vol. 2 (2008)
- Singular (2015)
- Mighty Business (2015), awarded as the "Blues Album of the Year 2015"
- Reborn (2018), awarded as the "Best Blues Album of the Year 2018"
- Sharing (2026)
