= Ileana Sărăroiu =

Romanian singer

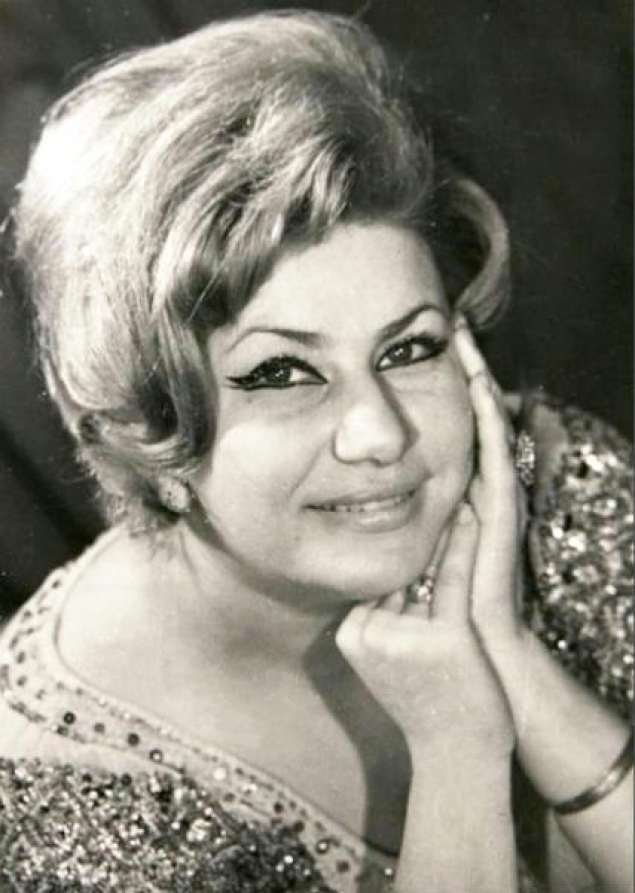
Ileana Sărăroiu

Ileana Sărăroiu (Romanian pronunciation: [iˈle̯ana sərəˈroiu]) (25 September 1936, Valea Voievozilor, Dâmbovița County – 12 May 1979, Unirea, Călărași County) was a Romanian singer of traditional and popular folk music. Her two signature songs are: "Doi voinici din Valea Mare" (Two Handsome Lads from Valea Mare) and "Unde e Târgoviștea" (Where is Târgoviște?). The first is a song about two lads who go hunting and encounter two sisters whom they end up marrying. The second is the story of a sad old mother who waits for her son in a train station. She does not see anybody come except a girl who she has never seen before; the girl turns out to be the wife of her son.

While singing at a wedding reception, Sărăroiu suddenly collapsed and died from a brain aneurysm in 1979 at the age of 42.

== Songs ==
- Doi voinici din Valea Mare (Two handsome lads from Valea Mare)
- Unde e Târgoviștea on YouTube (Where is Târgoviște?)
- Vrei să ne-ntâlnim sâmbătă seară? (Do you want to meet on Saturday evening?)
- Cine-a pus cârciuma în drum... (Who made the pub on the road...)
- Inimioara cu dor mult (Little heart with much longing)
- Asta seara stam aici pana dimineata on YouTube (Tonight we will be partying till morning)
- Da-ar naiba in tine dragoste (Love, be damned!)
- Foaie verde spic de grau on YouTube (You green leaf, wheat ear)
- Fir-ar ceasu' afurisit (That hour, be doomed!)
- Pasarica, muta-ti cuibul (Little Bird, move your nest!)
- De ce oare eu te-am cunoscut (Why did I ever meet you?)
- Inima de dor nu stii (Heart, you don't know the longing)
- Inima... (Heart...)
