= Altar (Romanian band) =

Romanian metal band

- Origin: Cluj Napoca, Romania
- Genres: death metal (early) thrash metal, heavy metal, Hardcore punk
- Years active: 1991 - present
- Members: Andy Ghost - vocal Teo Peter - bass guitar, vocal Damian - guitar Allen - drums

Altar is a romanian rock band from Cluj Napoca, that formed in 1991. After a couple of local shows, the band had their first national concert at the '91 Samrock Festival, where they won the prize for the most popular band. After the performance at the Timișoara '92 Studfest, Altar was considered the revelation of the festival. In 1995, the band released the Respect album and participated in the SkipRock '95 festival, winning the "Best Band" and "Best Rock Album" nominations of the year in Romania. They enjoyed enormous success afterwards, releasing six albums and becoming one of the most important rock bands in Romania.

== Band members ==
- Andy Ghost – lead vocals
- Teo Peter – bass guitar, founder, producer, composer
- Damian Donca– guitar
- Ianis Morar – guitar
- Eugen Tăbăcaru (Jenci) – drums

== Discography ==
- 1993: The Last Warning
- 1995: Respect
- 1998: Born Again
- 2006: Atitudine
- 2011: Mantra
- 2022: Rapsodia Românească
