= Ovidiu Lipan =

Romanian drummer

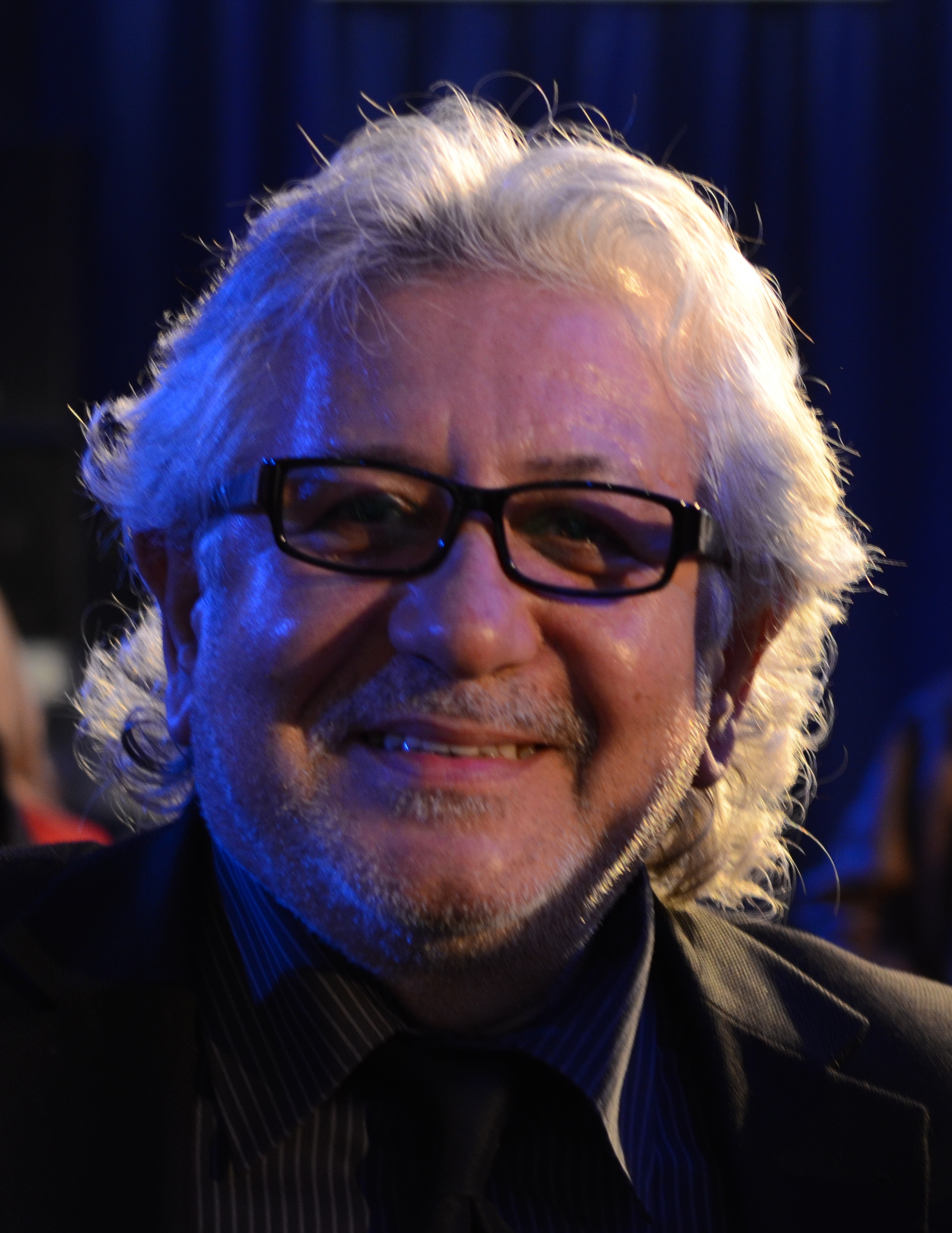
- Lipan in 2012

Background information
- Also known as: Țăndărică
- Born: Ovidiu Lipan; 31 January 1953; Iași, Romania
- Genres: Rock; World Music
- Occupations: Musician; songwriter
- Instrument: Drums
- Years active: 1964–present
- Labels: Electrecord; Hallen Records; Roton; Intercont Music; Revolver Records

Ovidiu Lipan 'Țăndărică' (born January 31, 1953 in Iași) is a Romanian drummer.

He played between 1966 and 1975 with the Romanian rock band Roșu și Negru. In 1975 he joined Phoenix. In 1977 he settled in Germany, but after 1990 he moved back to Romania. Now he has solo projects and also plays with Pasărea Rock. His 2007 album Iskender, a collaboration with Stelu Enache and Gheorghe Zamfir, featured reinterpretations of traditional Macedonian songs. The arrangements feature Greek, Roma, Slavic, and Celtic touches, among others, in such a manner designed to reflect Romania's multiculturalism. Since 2012, he has also collaborated with Romanian Latin rock band Bosquito, being featured on their single "Întuneric în culori", numerous live concerts with the band, and their 2012 MTV Unplugged show.

Lipan has a son, a musician like him, who lives in Germany.

== Discography ==
- Visul toboșarului (1999)
- Renașterea (2001)
- Aniversare (2003)
- Bachița (2004)
- Getica (2004)
- Visul toboșarului, re-edit (2005)
- La Passion (2006)
- Iskender (2007) - with Gheorghe Zamfir and Stelu Enache

with Phoenix (see Phoenix):

- Cantafabule (1975)
- Transsylvania (1981)
- Timișoara (1992)
- Aniversare 35 (1997)
- Baba Novak (2005)

with Madhouse:

- From the East (1979)
- Giacca de Blue (1979)

with Roșu și Negru:

- Roșu și Negru, single (1971)
- Leopardul, single (1971)
- Oameni de zăpadă, single (1974)
- Imnul copiilor, single (1974)

with Lipan Connection:

- Excalibur, single (1997)
- Transilvania (1998)
