= Pasărea Colibri =

Romanian folk music band

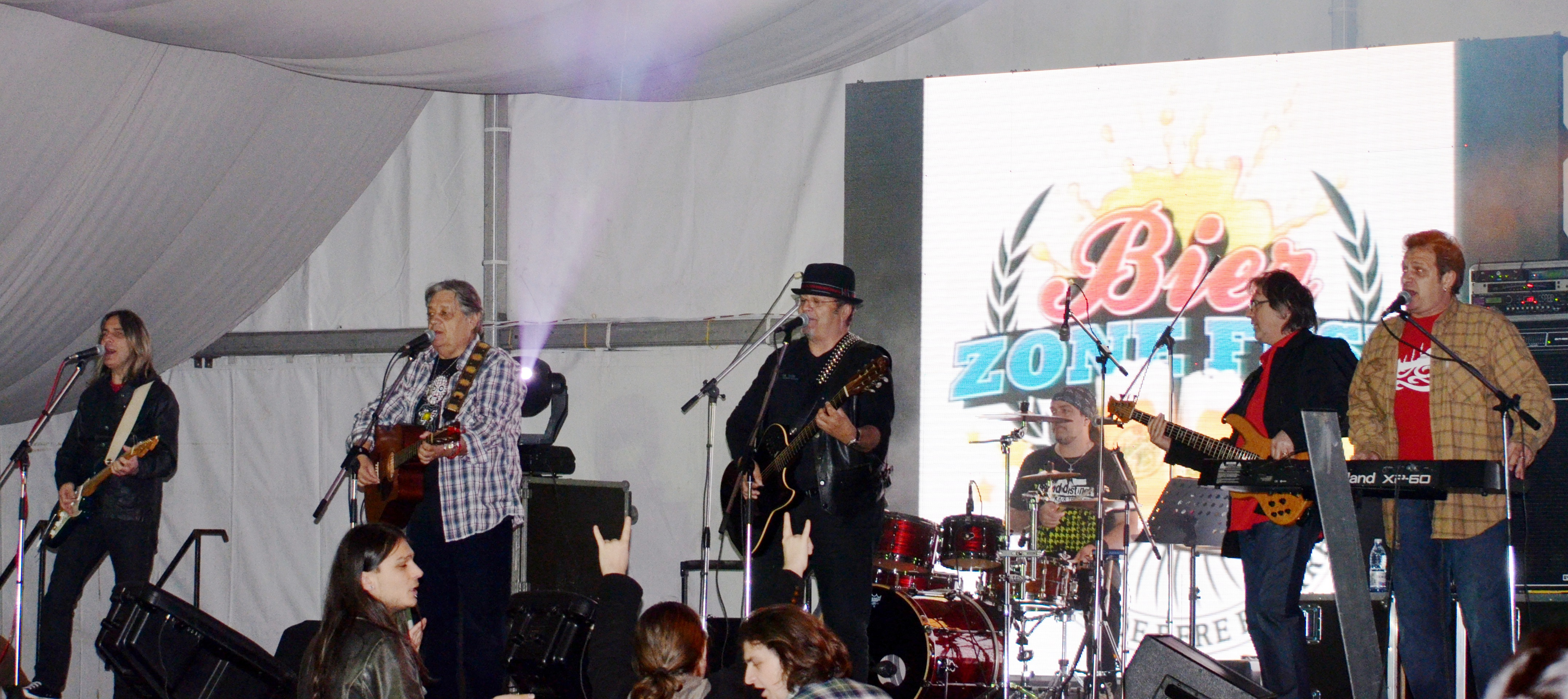
- Pasărea Colibri concert in April 2012

Background information
- Origin: Bucharest and Timișoara, Romania
- Genres: Folk, folk rock
- Years active: 1992–2003; 2009–present (occasionally)
- Labels: Roton
- Members: Mircea Baniciu; Mircea Vintilă; Vlady Cnejevici
- Past members: Florian Pittiș; Marius Bațu
- Website: www.pasareacolibri.ro

Pasărea Colibri (Romanian pronunciation: [ˈpasəre̯a koliˈbri], "The Hummingbird") is a Romanian folk supergroup. Aside from typical Romanian folk instruments and acoustic/electric guitars, the band also made use of digital and analogue synthesizers, pedal steel guitars, and fretless bass.

The band formed in 1992 while Mircea Baniciu, who had left the group Transsylvania Phoenix after conflicts with leader Nicu Covaci, was performing in Râmnicu Vâlcea. At the end of Baniciu's set, actor Florian Pittiș and folk musician Mircea Vintilă, together with Compact keyboardist Vlady Cnejevici, joined him for an improvised performance after which Pittiș announced the project was to be named Pasărea Colibri, as a reference to Baniciu's on and off collaboration with Transsylvania Phoenix. The four musicians started performing together and released their first album, În căutarea cuibului pierdut (Seeking the Lost Nest) in 1995. A live album containing no new work, as most of the songs the group performed were covers of Transsylvania Phoenix's old hits or Baniciu and Vintilă's own compositions, it catapulted the group to superstardom in Romania making them widely popular as Pasărea Colibri. Pittiș left the group in 2001 to focus on other personal projects, such as Radio3Net, and to work for football club Rapid București of which he was longtime fan. Folk songwriter Marius Bațu replaced him in the group and Pasărea Colibri released one more album before disbanding in 2003. Pittiș died in 2007.

As of 2009, the remaining members are on good terms and still perform together occasionally under the "Pasărea Colibri" name. Cnejevici also worked extensively with Baniciu on various other projects, such as producing his 2009 "Best-Of" album and performing with him live in concerts throughout Romania.

On 25 November 2011, Pasărea Colibri released an anniversary album named entitled "19 ani" (19 years). On this occasion, Mircea Baniciu and Mircea Vintilă held a concert at Sala Palatului with a band consisting of Vlady Cnejevici, Teo Boar, Cristi Iorga, and Marian Mihăilescu.

Marius Bațu died from a heart attack on 23 November 2024, at the age of 65.

== Discography ==
- "În căutarea cuibului pierdut" – "Finding the lost nest" (1995);
- "Ciripituri" – "Peeps" (1996);
- "Cântece de Bivuac" – "Bivouac songs" (1999);
- "Încă 2000 de ani" – "Another 2000 years" (2002);
- "10 ani" – "10 years" (2003) (Best-Of Live Album);
- "Sunt tânăr, Doamnă..." (Compilation, 2008)
- "19 ani" – "19 years" (2011).
