= Mircea Baniciu =

Romanian musician and singer-songwriter

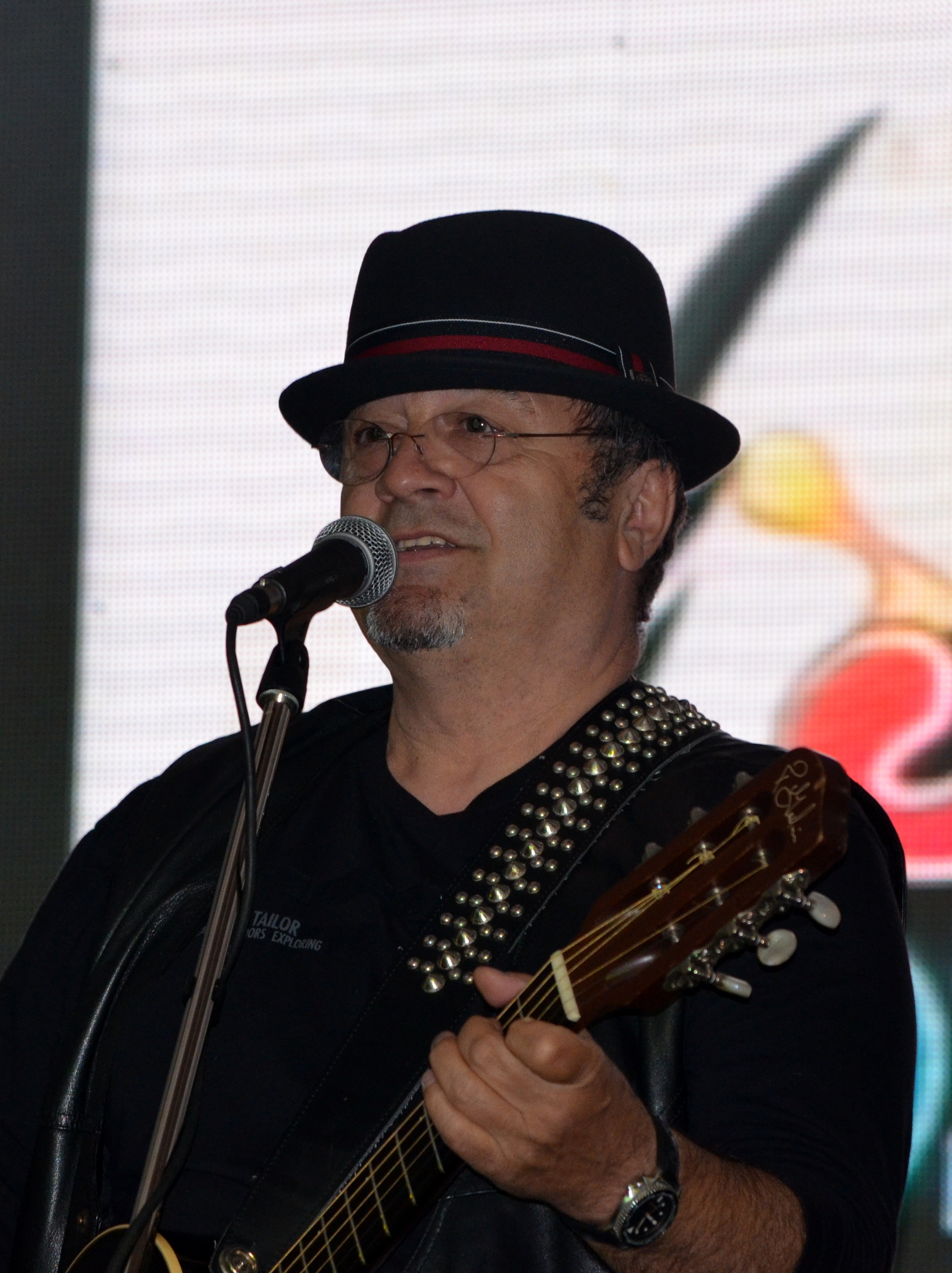
- Baniciu performing live onstage

Background information
- Born: 31 July 1949 (age 77); Timișoara, Timiș County, Romania
- Genres: Folk; Rock; Folk rock
- Occupations: Musician; singer-songwriter
- Instruments: Vocals; Guitar
- Years active: 1972–present
- Labels: Electrecord; East&Art; Eurostar; Intercont Music; Genius CD; Roton; Phoenix Records; Zone Records; Cat Music
- Member of: Phoenix; Pasărea Colibri; Pasărea Rock
- Website: mirceabaniciu.ro

Mircea Baniciu (Romanian pronunciation: [ˈmirtʃe̯a baˈnitʃju]; born 31 July 1949) is a Romanian musician, singer, and songwriter. Originally known as the lead singer of the Romanian rock group Phoenix, Baniciu quit the group when they illegally fled Romania for West Germany in 1977, continuing his career as a successful solo singer throughout the 1980s before forming a folk supergroup in 1992 with fellow musicians Mircea Vintilă, Vlady Cnejevici, and Florian Pittiș, with whom he had successfully toured Romania during the 1990s.

Following the Romanian Revolution, Baniciu re-joined Phoenix as their lead singer, but, due to frequent disagreements with band leader Nicu Covaci, has performed and appeared on the group's albums irregularly, before finally quitting Phoenix permanently in 2007. In 2014, with fellow Phoenix bandmates Josef Kappl and Ovidiu Lipan "Țăndărică", Baniciu formed Pasărea Rock (i.e. "The Rock Bird"), a folk rock supergroup.

== Discography ==
Solo discography:

- Mircea Baniciu EP (1979)
- Tristeți provinciale (1980)
- Ploaia (1984)
- Secunda 1 (1988)
- Secunda 2 (1992)
- Eșarfa (Best Of) Vol. 1 (2008)

with Phoenix (see Phoenix):

- Cei ce ne-au dat nume (1972)
- Meșterul Manole EP (1973)
- Mugur de fluier (1974)
- Cantafabule (1975)
- Timișoara (1992)
- Anniversare 35 (1997)
- Baba Novak (2005)

with Pasărea Colibri:

- În căutarea cuibului pierdut (1995)
- Ciripituri (1997)
- Cântece de bivuac (1999)
- Înca 2000 de ani (2002)
- 10 ani vol. 1+2 (2003)
