= Nikolaus Lenau High School =

- Nikolaus-Lenau-Lyzeum
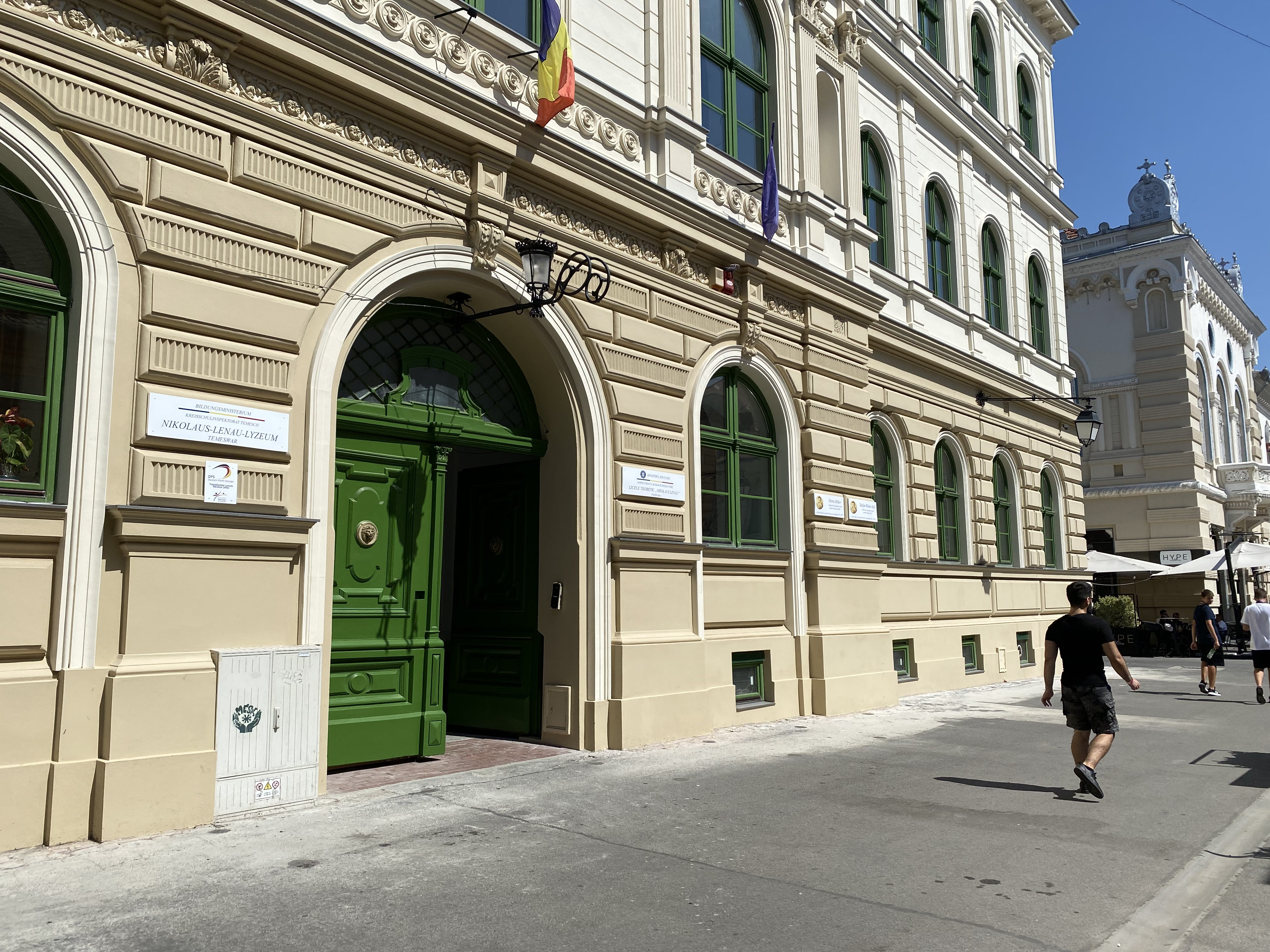

Location
- Strada Gheorghe Lazăr, Nr. 2 Timișoara, Timiș County; Romania; 45°45′28″N 21°13′36″E

Information
- Type: Public
- Established: 23 April 1870; 156 years ago
- Authority: Ministry of National Education
- Principal: Elena Wolf
- Faculty: 93 (2016/2017)
- Grades: I–XII/XIII
- Enrollment: 1,388 (2016/2017)
- Language: German
- Campus type: Urban
- Website: nlenau.ro

Nikolaus Lenau High School (German: Nikolaus-Lenau-Lyzeum; Romanian: Liceul Teoretic "Nikolaus Lenau") is a German-language high school located at 2 Gheorghe Lazăr Street, Timișoara, Romania. The school was founded in 1870 and is named after the 19th-century romantic poet Nikolaus Lenau who was born in the nearby village of Lenauheim. Besides high school education (Lyzealklassen), the school additionally offers primary education (Grundschulklassen) and intermediate education (Gymnasialklassen) using German as the language of instruction for the most part. The Nikolaus Lenau High School is currently considered the most important German-language high school in Banat. The German language of instruction at the Nikolaus Lenau High School is not identical to standard German due to specific language changes; it is known by linguists as "Lenau German".

Novelist Herta Müller, laureate of the Nobel Prize in Literature, graduated from the school. Physicist Stefan Hell, who shared the 2014 Nobel Prize in Chemistry, attended ninth grade there before emigrating to West Germany. In 1962, guitarist Béla Kamocsa, who was a student at Lenau and a drummer for the local orchestra, met fellow musician Nicu Covaci, who had been hired by one of the band leaders to produce and perform a school concert, founding Transsylvania Phoenix during the production process. Another graduate of the school is mathematician Adrian Constantin, recipient of the 2020 Wittgenstein Award, the most prestigious scientific award in Austria.

== History ==
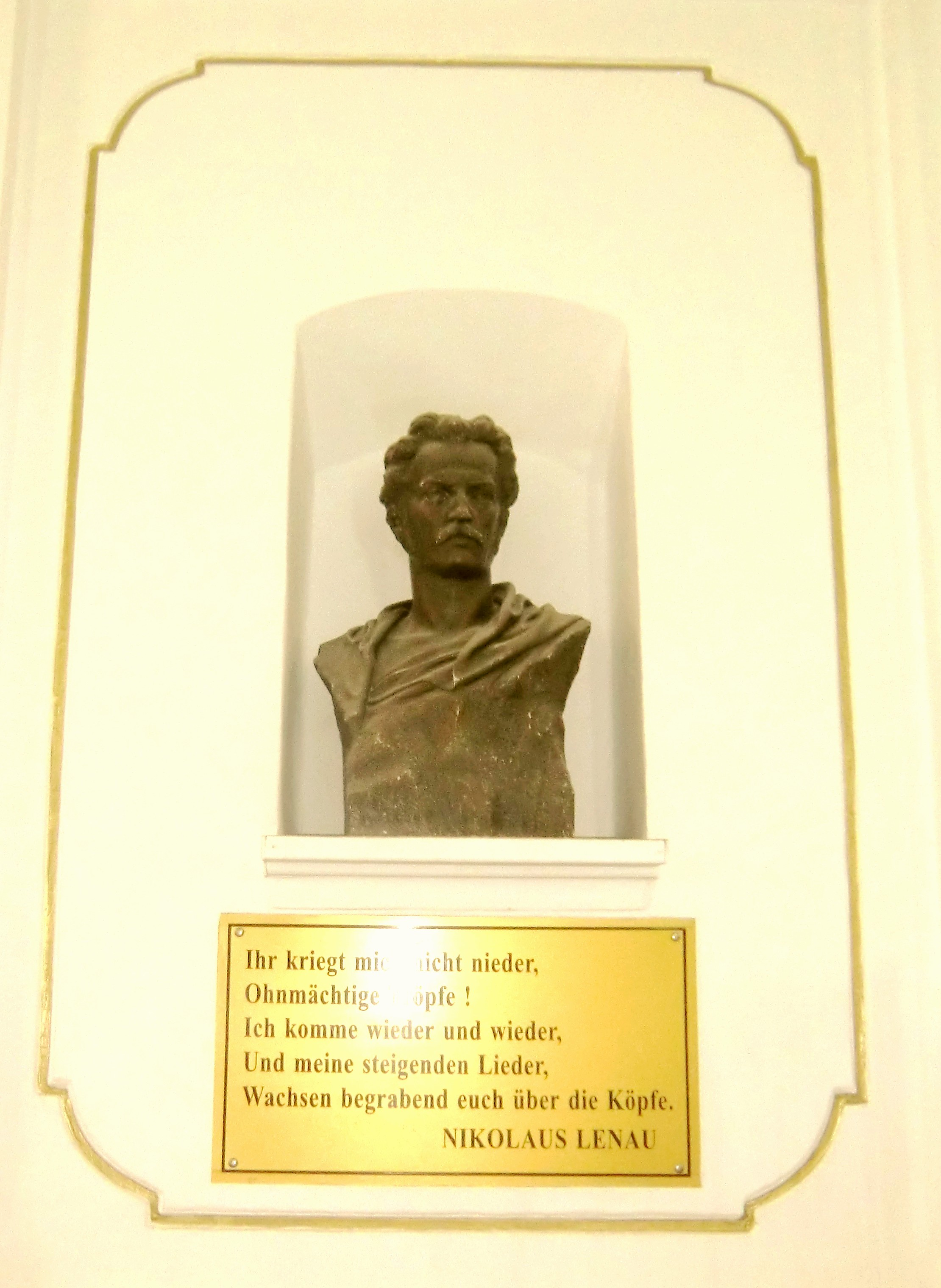
Bust of Nikolaus Lenau in the entrance hall of the Nikolaus Lenau High School

In 1761, the two-storey neoclassical building designed by the architect Heinrich Baader and built by the civil engineer Johann Reiber was initially the Serbian (Rascian) Town Hall, then a forerunner of the German State Theater in Timișoara with German classics on the repertoire. The "waltz king" Johann Strauss II often made guest appearances here, and in 1796 the first performance of Wolfgang Amadeus Mozart's The Magic Flute took place there.

In a climate of self-confident bourgeoisie, the call for a fully developed higher education institution was loud. On 23 April 1870, it was decided, based on a contract concluded between the Ministry of Cults and Public Instruction in Budapest and the Timișoara City Hall, to establish the Staatsoberrealschule ("Real State High School"). The organization of the school was the responsibility of the state, the Hungarian Ministry of Cults and Public Instruction was to appoint the principal and teachers, the mayor's office having only a limited right to appoint the faculty. After seven years of remodeling the building, the Oberrealschule moved in during 1879, which was housed in the building of the municipal public hospital from 1870 to 1878. With the completion of the festive hall in 1882, the construction work at the school was completed. In the Oberrealschule, special emphasis was placed on analytical geometry, physics, chemistry, natural sciences and drawing. Initially, the language of instruction was German, later Hungarian with explanations in German, as most students were not fluent in Hungarian.

After the Banat was divided into three in 1919 and the Oberrealschule was renamed the Deutsches Staatsgymnasium ("German State High School"), German was introduced as the language of instruction, with a Hungarian section until 1927. From 1941 to 1944, the German girls' high school operated in the high school building, and in 1942 the school was named "Nikolaus Lenau", after the Banat-born Austrian poet. For a brief period, starting with 1952, it has been called the Boys' High School no. 2. Between 1952 and 1955, the Faculty of Labor functioned in the high school building.

German education was initially discontinued under communist rule. Between 1944 and 1948 the confessional schools continued to operate until their nationalization in 1948. The same happened with the two German-language teacher training colleges in Banat. In 1959 the independence of numerous German schools was abolished; they only continued to exist as sections of Romanian schools, with the exception of three secondary schools, including the Nikolaus Lenau High School. After World War II, the German High School was housed first in the building of the Constantin Diaconovici Loga High School and from 1955 again in the old building at 2 Gheorghe Lazăr Street. On 26 May 1957, the school was renamed the Nikolaus Lenau High School, which was confirmed by decree in 1970 to mark the centenary of the school.

In the autumn of 1968, the then principal of the Nikolaus Lenau High School, Erich Pfaff, founded the German adult education center in Timișoara. As the founder, he was also the head and main lecturer of this adult education institution. The lectures took place monthly in the beginning, then bimonthly and later weekly in the festive hall of the high school. The Nikolaus Lenau High School and the adult education center were important meeting places for the German population in and around Timișoara. It was a perpetually open school for all generations.

== Organization and material base ==
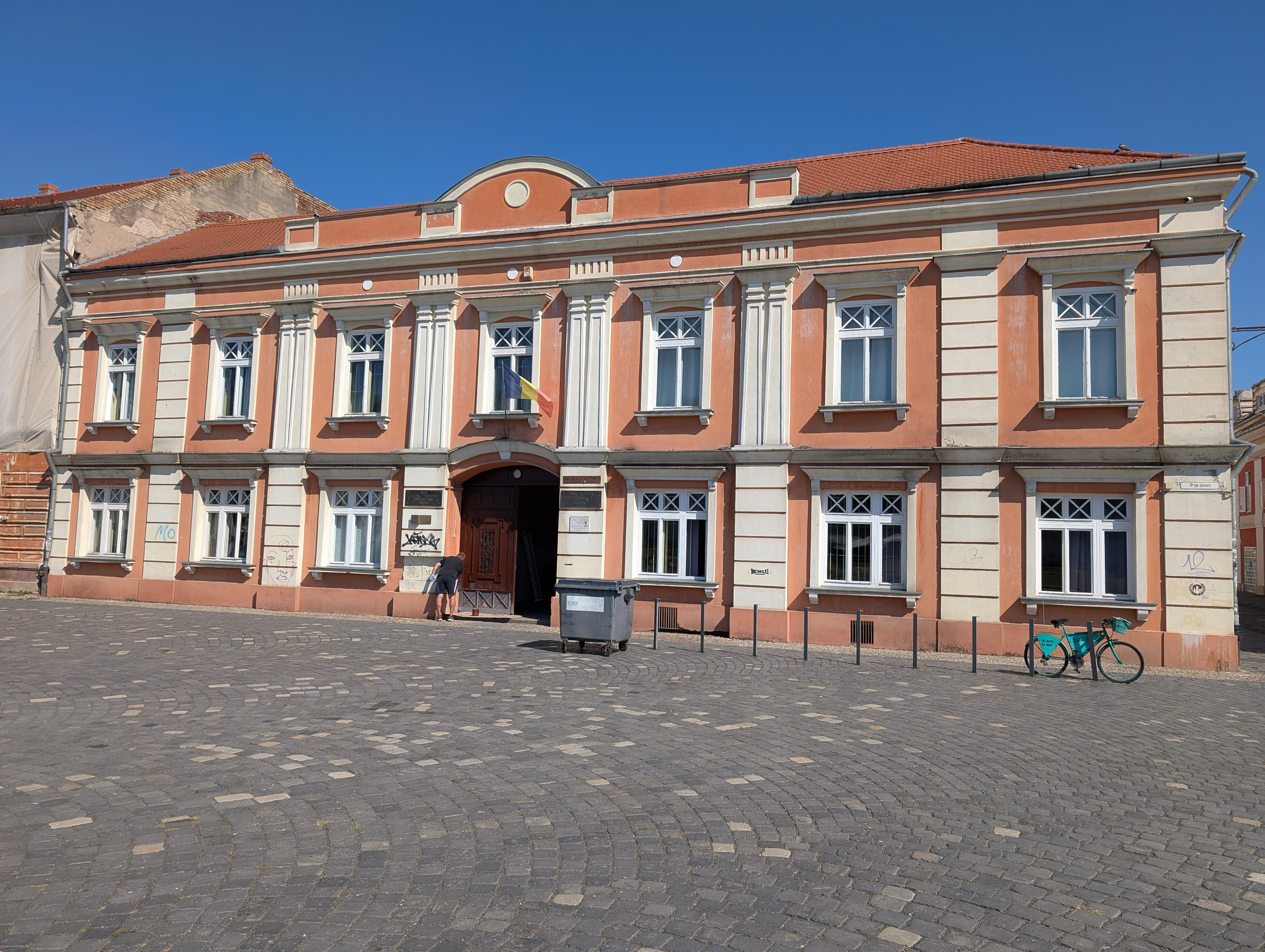
"Little Lenau" in Union Square

As of 2016/2017, the Nikolaus Lenau High School has 24 primary school classes (616 students), 18 secondary school classes (441 students) and 12 high school classes (331 students). With the exception of three primary school classes, all classes are taught in German.

The school is a recognized ICDL examination center and has 68 classrooms, 10 laboratories, a sports hall and a 24,000-volume library. There is also a canteen, a boarding school with 100 places and a youth hostel with 51 places. Primary school courses (1st–4th grades) have been held since 1960 in the former inn and café La cei Șapte Principi Electori in Union Square, often called "Little Lenau" (Romanian: Lenau Mic) today. 5th–12th grades of the high school are located in the immediate vicinity, on Gheorghe Lazăr Street. A new campus with four buildings in the Popa Șapcă-Oituz area is scheduled to be completed in 2022. The new campus has been designed with 48 classrooms, physics, biology, chemistry and computer science laboratories, a sports hall, a German-language library and a digital library, as well as a medical office and many other administrative facilities.

== Principals ==
Name	Term
Heinrich Feichter	1948–1962
Lucia Blaga	1962–1965
Liviu Pop	1965–1970
Floare Glăja	1970–1972
Erich Pfaff	1971–1987
Erika Müller	1987–1990
Erich Pfaff	1990–1992
Ovidiu Ganț	1992–2001
Elena Wolf	2001–2023
Simona Mateiu	2023–present

== Notable students and teachers ==
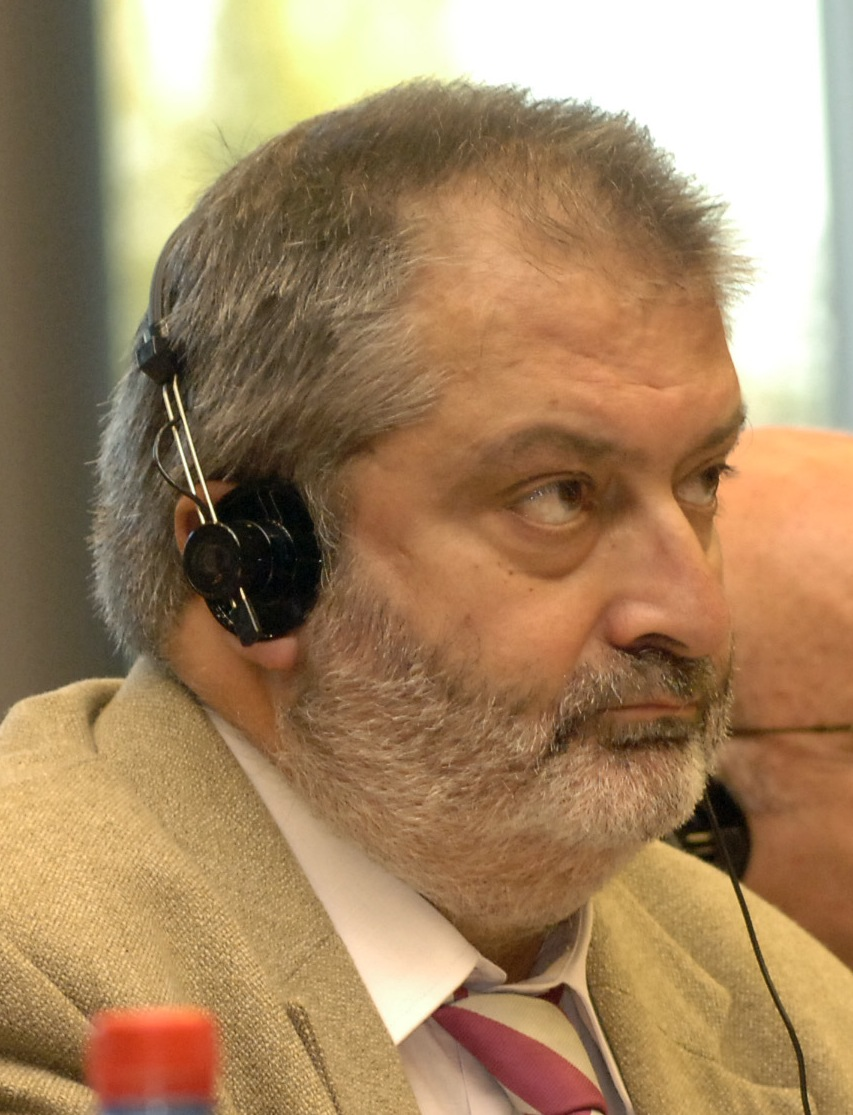
Gheorghe Ciuhandu

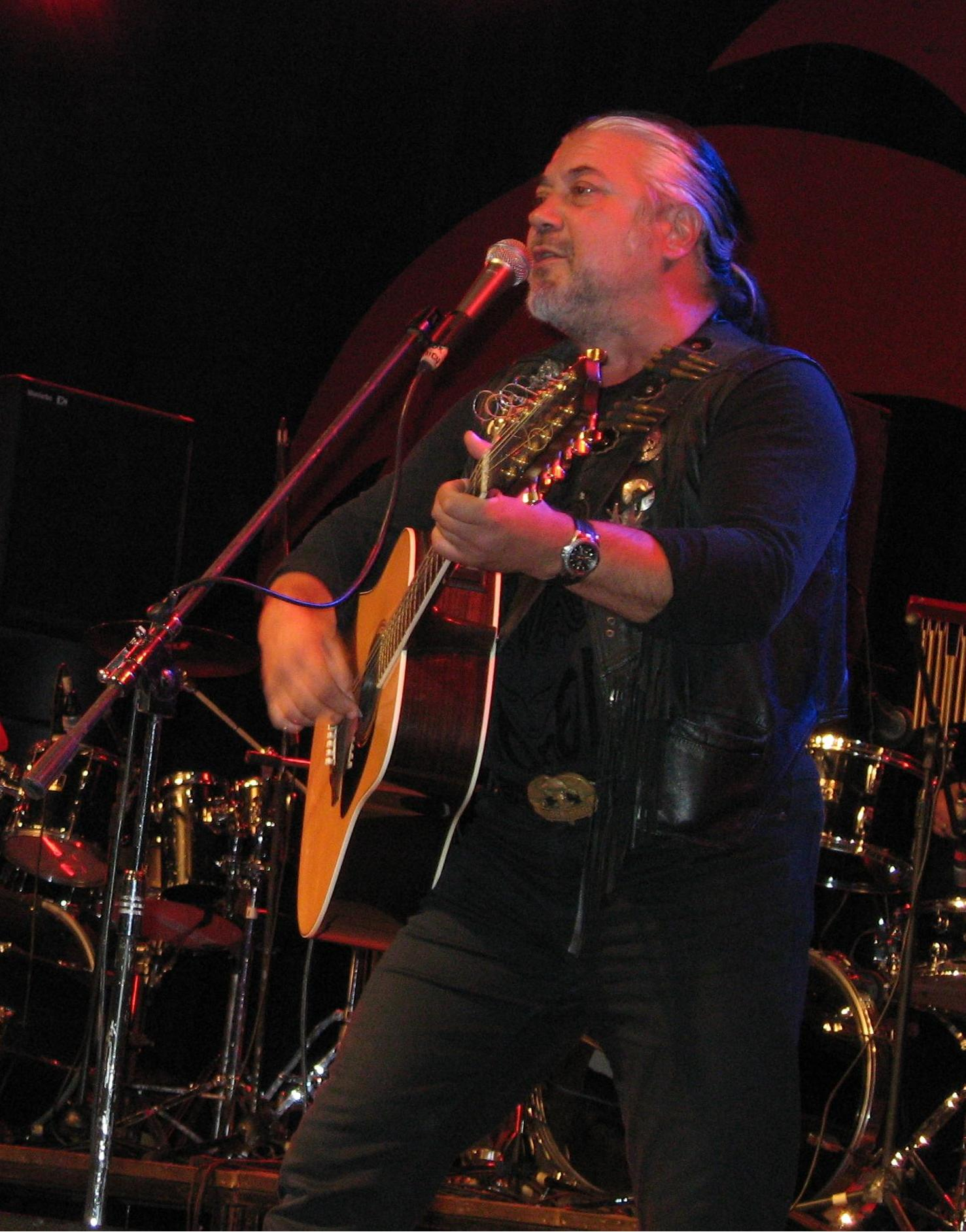
Nicu Covaci

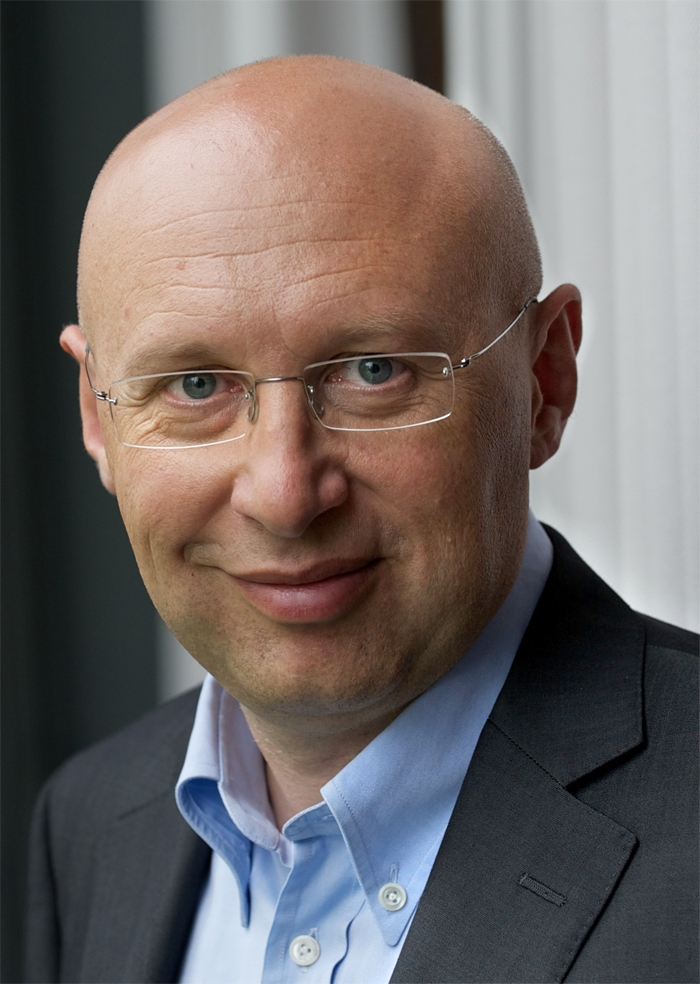
Stefan Hell

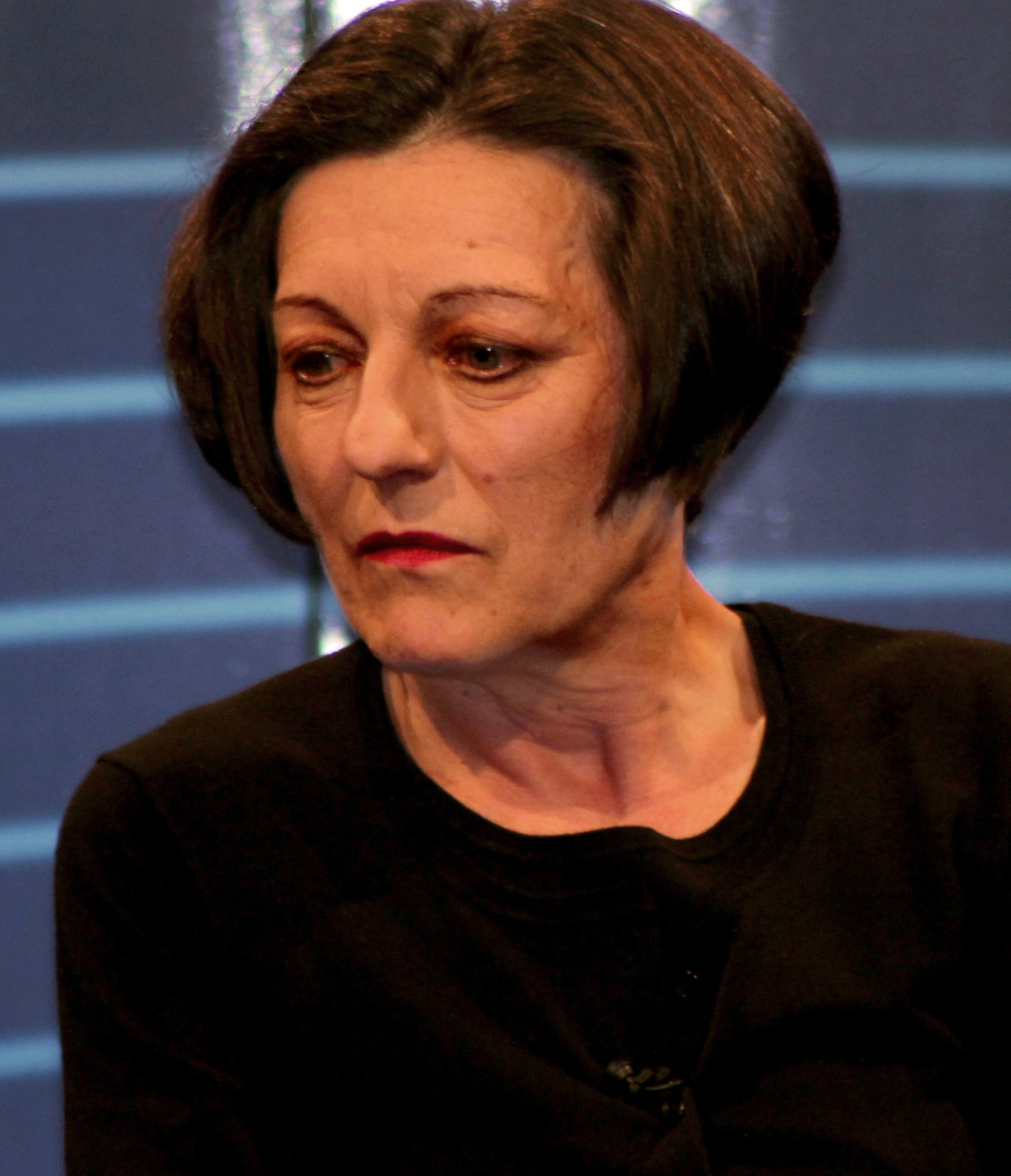
Herta Müller

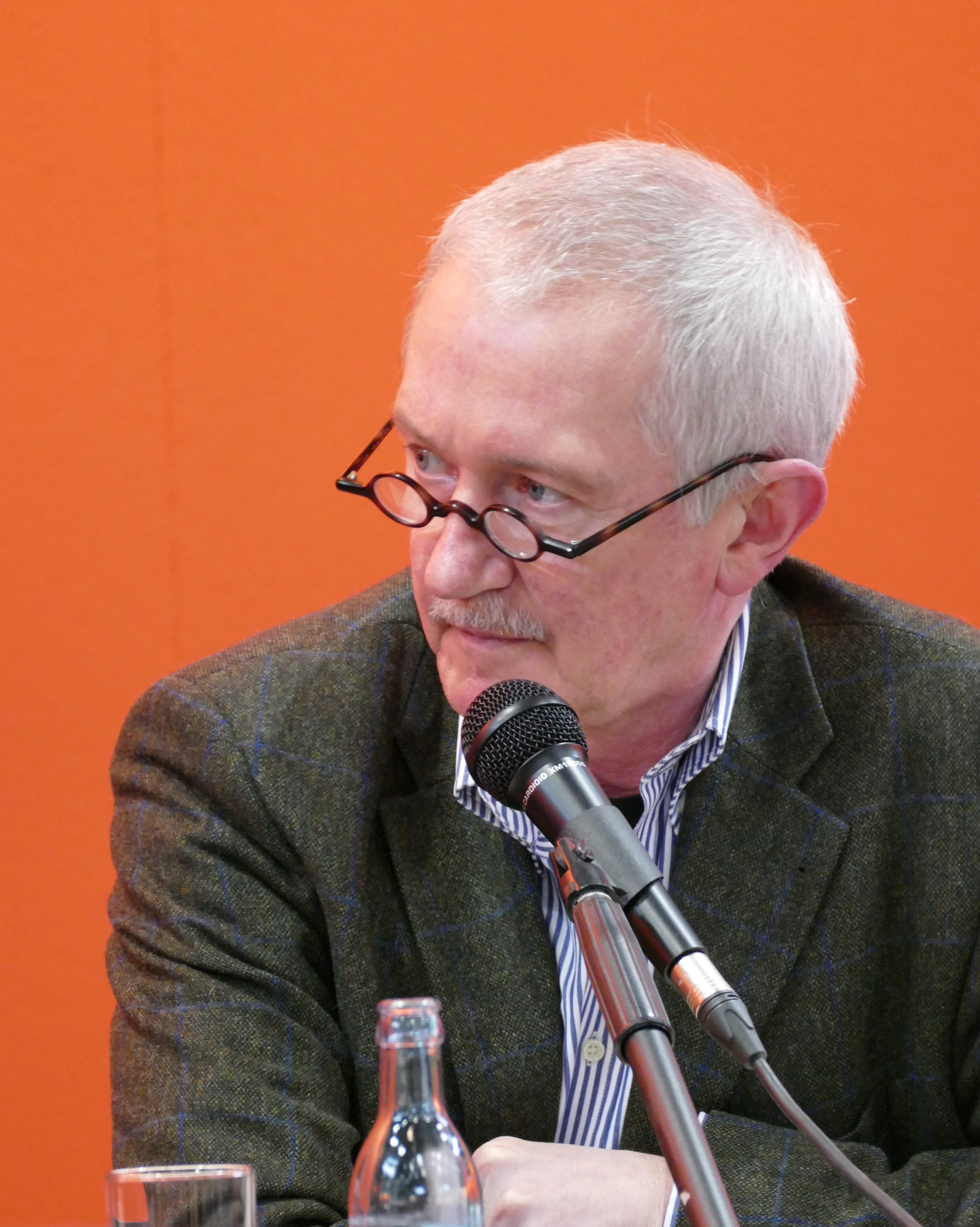
Ernest Wichner
- Mircea Breazu (b. 1946), actor, stuntman and choreographer
- Gheorghe Ciuhandu (b. 1947), mayor of Timișoara (1996–2012)
- Adrian Constantin (b. 1970), mathematician
- Nicu Covaci (1947–2024), frontman and guitarist of Transsylvania Phoenix
- Hans Diplich (1909–1990), poet, writer and folklorist
- Hans Fink (b. 1942), journalist and publicist
- Helmuth Frauendorfer (b. 1959), writer and journalist
- Ferdinand Hauptmann (1913–1989), Roman Catholic cleric
- Stefan Hell (b. 1962), physicist and Nobel laureate in chemistry (2014)
- Hans Wolfram Hockl (1912–1998), writer
- Rudolf Hollinger (1910–1997), professor, poet and playwright
- Hans Kehrer (1913–2009), actor, poet and playwright
- Konrad Kernweisz (1913–1981), Roman Catholic cleric
- Franz Liebhard (1899–1989), poet and playwright
- Herta Müller (b. 1953), novelist, poet, essayist and Nobel laureate in literature (2009)
- Mihai Opriș (b. 1948), architect
- Richard Oschanitzky (1939–1979), composer, arranger, pianist and conductor
- Eduard Schneider (b. 1944), poet, writer and editor
- Ernest Wichner (b. 1952), writer and translator
