= Johann-Heinrich-Voß-Preis für Übersetzung =

Translation award

The Johann Heinrich Voß Prize in Translation (German: Johann-Heinrich-Voß-Preis für Übersetzung) is awarded yearly by the Deutsche Akademie für Sprache und Dichtung in Darmstadt.

Established 1958, it was named after the German poet and philologist Johann Heinrich Voß, who achieved renown as the first person to translate Homer's Iliad and Odyssey from Ancient Greek into German.

The prize is administered by a jury that serves a three-year term. The jury for the 2020 term consisted of Iso Camartin, Aris Fioretos, Daniel Göske, Susanne Lange, Gabriele Leupold, Ernst Osterkamp, and Anne Weber.

Not to be confused with the Johann-Heinrich-Voß-Preis für Literatur und Politik.

== Winners ==
- 1958: Edwin Muir and Willa Muir
- 1959: Benno Geiger
- 1960: E. K. Rahsin (Elisabeth "Less" Kaerrick)
- 1961: Jakob Hegner
- 1962: Rudolf Alexander Schröder
- 1963: Friedhelm Kemp
- 1964: Michael Hamburger
- 1965: Wolfgang Schadewaldt
- 1966: Eva Rechel-Mertens, Philippe Jaccottet
- 1967: Witold Wirpsza, Karl Dedecius
- 1968: Eva Hesse
- 1969: Hans Hennecke
- 1970: Janheinz Jahn
- 1971: Karl August Horst
- 1972: Elmar Tophoven
- 1973: Peter Gan (Richard Moering)
- 1974: Peter Urban
- 1975: Curt Meyer-Clason
- 1976: Hanns Grössel
- 1977: Edwin Maria Landau
- 1978: Übersetzerkollegium der Deutschen Thomas von Aquin-Ausgabe
- 1979: Gerda Scheffel and Helmut Scheffel
- 1980: Annemarie Schimmel
- 1981: Wolfgang Kasack
- 1982: Heinz von Sauter
- 1983: Rolf-Dietrich Keil
- 1984: Anneliese Botond
- 1985: Elisabeth Schnack
- 1986: Hanno Helbling
- 1987: Rudolf Wittkopf
- 1988: Traugott König
- 1989: Michael Walter
- 1990: Manfred Fuhrmann
- 1991: Fritz Vogelgsang
- 1992: Simon Werle
- 1993: Roswitha Matwin-Buschmann
- 1994: Werner von Koppenfels
- 1995: Rosemarie Tietze
- 1996: Joachim Kalka
- 1997: Hans-Horst Henschen
- 1998: Gustav Just
- 1999: Harry Rowohlt
- 2000: Armin Eidherr
- 2001: Burkhart Kroeber
- 2002: Gisela Perlet
- 2003: Hans Wolf
- 2004: Michael von Albrecht
- 2005: Elisabeth Edl
- 2006: Ralph Dutli
- 2007: Stefan Weidner
- 2008: Verena Reichel
- 2009: Susanne Lange
- 2010: Zsuzsanna Gahse
- 2011: Frank Günther
- 2012: Gabriele Leupold
- 2013: Wolfgang Kubin
- 2014: Sabine Stöhr
- 2015: Anne Birkenhauer
- 2016: Anne Weber
- 2017: Renate Schmidgall
- 2018: Wolfgang Schlüter
- 2019: Kurt Steinmann
- 2020: Ernest Wichner
- 2021: Barbara Kleiner
- 2022: Rainer G. Schmidt
- 2023: Andreas Tretner
- 2024: Esther Kinsky
- 2025: Stefan Moster
- 2026: Ulrich Blumenbach
