= List of Phoenix (Romanian band) members =

Phoenix
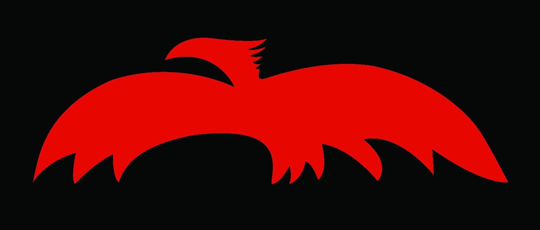

Background information
- Genres: Rock and roll, hard rock
- Years active: 1962–present
- Members: Costin Adam; Cristi Gram; Flavius Hosu; Vlady Săteanu; Lavinia Săteanu

The following is a list of musicians who have been members of Romanian rock and roll band Phoenix since their formation in Timișoara in 1962. The current lineup consists of five members.

== Current lineup ==
Cristi Gram

Active: 2004–2014, 2015–present
Instruments: lead guitar, background vocals
Release contributions: Baba Novak

Costin Adam

Active: 2014–present
Instruments: vocals
Release contributions: Vino, Țepeș

Flavius Hosu

Active: 2014–present
Instruments: drums
Release contributions: Vino, Țepeș

Vlady Săteanu

Instruments: bass guitar, background vocals
Active: 2017–present

Lavinia Săteanu

Active: 2017–present
Instruments: violin

=== Former members ===
- Nicu Covaci - guitar, lead vocals (1962–2024; died 2024)
- Ioan "Pilu" Ștefanovici – drums (1962–1967, 1969–1970)
- Kamocsa Bela – bass guitar, drums (1962–1971; died 2010)
- Claudiu Rotaru – lead guitar (1962–1968)
- Florin Dumitru – drums (1968)
- Dorel Vintilă Zaharia – drums (1967–1968, 1969–1970)
- Florin "Moni" Bordeianu - drums, lead vocals (1963-1970, 1977-1978, 1997-2024 - occasionally; died 2024)
- Valeriu Sepi – percussion (1971–1974; died 2026)
- Günther Reininger – keyboards, backing vocals (1968–1970, 1974–1976; died 2015)
- Mircea Baniciu – lead vocals, rhythm guitar (1971–1977, 1990–1992, 1997–1998, 2001–2003, 2004–2007)
- Josef Kappl – bass guitar, backing vocals, violin, blockflöte (1971–1979, 1986–1992, 1998–1999, 2004–2008)
- Costin Petrescu – drums (1971–1975)
- Ovidiu Lipan "Țăndărică" – drums (1975–1979, 1984–1998, 2001–2012)
- Mani Neumann – violin, recorder, backing vocals (1979–1981, 1989–2008)
- Bogdan Bradu - lead vocals (2007 - 2014)
- Tom Buggie – bass guitar (1980–1981)
- Volker Vaessen – bass guitar, backing vocals, (1992–1998, 1999-2000, 2002–2004, 2008-2017)
- Lucian Cioargă – drums (1999–2000)
- Tavi Colen – lead vocals (1999–2000)
- Alin Oprea – lead guitar, backing vocals (1999–2000)
- Andrei Cerbu – guitar (2014–2015)
- Marc Alexandru Tint – guitar (2014–2016)

Former touring musicians

- Mitu Cîmpan – piano (1962–1964)
- Doru Creșneac – lead guitar (1963–1965)
- Adi Pavlovici – lead guitar, backing vocals (1962–1963)
- Zoltan Kovacs – bass guitar (1970–1971)
- Liviu Butoi – oboe, flute (1970–1973)
- Erlend Krauser – rhythm and lead guitar, backing vocals (1976–1978)
- Cornel Liuba – drums (1970–1971, 1976–1977)
- Ștefan Bartha – bass guitar (1973)
- Eugen Gondi – drums (1975)
- Ulli Heidelberg – lead guitar, violin, backing vocals (1978–1980)
- Sabin Dumbrăveanu – cello (1980–1981)
- Bubi Dobrozemsky – cello, backing vocals 1978–1981
- Cristoph Bank – bass guitar (1978)
- Mainolf Bauschulte – drums (1979–1980)
- Dietrich "Dixie" Krauser – bass guitar, vocals (1987–1989, 1990)
- Dzidek Marcinkiewicz - keyboards, bass guitar (1983, 1985–1999, 2008–2018)
- Dragoș Bădoi – lead vocals (1992–1994)
- Malcolm J. Lewis – lead vocals (2000)
- Eugen Tegu – bass guitar (2001–2002)
- Bogdan Bradu – lead vocals (2003–2004, 2007–2013)
- Ionuț Contraș – percussion, backing vocals (2005–2010)
- Cristina Kisseleff – violin (2012 - 2014)
- Ionuț Micu – drums (2011–2014)
- Roxana Zanga – drums (2015–2016)
- Sergiu Corbu Boldor – violin (2014–2015)
