= Grossel =

Grossel, Grössel, Groessel are German-language surnames. Notable people with the surnames include:

- Matt Grossell, American politician
- Ira Grossel, birth name of Jeff Chandler, American actor, film producer, and singer
- Hanns Grössel, German literary translator and broadcasting journalist
