= Europäischer Übersetzerpreis Offenburg =

German literary award

Europäischer Übersetzerpreis Offenburg is a German literary prize for translators. It was donated in equal parts by the City of Offenburg and the Hubert Burda Foundation in 2005 and has been awarded every two years since 2006 for outstanding cultural achievements. The prize money is €15,000.

== Award winners ==
- 2006 Renate Schmidgall (Darmstadt) for her translations from Polish
- 2008 Anne Weber (Paris) for her translations from French
- 2010 Hanns Grössel (Cologne) for his translations from Danish, French and Swedish
- 2012 Christina Viragh (Rome) for her translations from Hungarian
- 2014 Christian Hansen for his translations from Spanish
- 2016 Andreas Ecke (Wuppertal) for his translations from Dutch
- 2018 Michael Walter (Munich) for his translations from English

== Juries ==
- 2006 Karl Dedecius (jury and laudator)
- 2008 Peter Handke (jury), Werner Spies (laudator)
- 2010 Hinrich Schmidt-Henkel (jury), Siegfried Lenz (laudator)
- 2012 Péter Nádas (laudator)
- 2014 Paul Ingendaay (jury and laudator)
- 2016 Christoph Buchwald (jury and laudator)
- 2018 Heinrich Detering (jury und laudator)
