= Peter Urban (translator) =

German writer and translator

Peter Urban (16 July 1941 – 9 December 2013) was a German writer and translator.

== Biography ==
Urban was born in Berlin. He studied History, German studies and Slavic studies at the Julius-Maximilians-Universität Würzburg and the University of Belgrade.

Petar Urban became famous for his translations of Russian authors, including Isaak Babel, Anton Chekhov, Daniel Charms, Leonid Dobychin, Ivan Goncharov, Nikolai Gogol, Alexander Pushkin, and Ivan Turgenev. He also translated from Serbian, Serbo-Croatian, Slovene and Czech.

He was granted several important translation prizes, such as the Übersetzerpreis der Akademie für Sprache und Dichtung, the Preis der Stadt Münster für Europäische Poesie, the Johann-Heinrich-Voß-Preis für Übersetzung and the Helmut-M.-Braem-Übersetzerpreis.

A street in Belgrade is named after him.
