= Preis der Stadt Münster für Internationale Poesie =

German literary award

The Prize of the City of Münster for International Poetry (German: Preis der Stadt Münster für Internationale (ehemals Europäische) Poesie) is a German literary award recognizing outstanding contemporary poetry and its translation. The award is endowed with €15,500 and is split equally between the author and the translator(s).

The prize was established in 1993 as the "Preis der Stadt Münster für Europäische Poesie". It is awarded biennially (every two years) as part of the Lyriktreffen Münster (Münster Poetry Festival), which began in 1979.

In 2024, the prize was officially renamed to the Prize of the City of Münster for International Poetry to reflect a global focus. The prize aims to encourage publishers to make important contemporary foreign-language poetry accessible through high-quality German translations.

== Award winners ==
- 1993 Andrea Zanzotto (poet); Donatella Capaldi, Ludwig Paulmichl and Peter Waterhouse (translators)
- 1995 Inger Christensen (poet); Hanns Grössel (translator)
- 1997 Zbigniew Herbert (poet); Klaus Staemmler (translator)
- 1999 Gellu Naum (poet); Oskar Pastior (translator)
- 2001 Hugo Claus (poet); Maria Csollány and Waltraud Hüsmert (translator)
- 2003 Miodrag Pavlović (poet); Peter Urban (translator)
- 2005 Daniel Bănulescu (poet); Ernest Wichner (translator)
- 2007 Tomaž Šalamun (poet); Fabjan Hafner (translator)
- 2009 Caius Dobrescu (poet); Gerhardt Csejka (translator)
- 2011 Ben Lerner (poet); Steffen Popp (translator)
- 2013 Derek Walcott; Werner von Koppenfels
- 2015 Charles Bernstein; VERSATORIUM, Tobias Amslinger, Norbert Lange, Léonce W. Lupette, Mathias Traxler
- 2017 Jon Fosse; Hinrich Schmidt-Henkel
- 2019 Eugene Ostashevsky; Monika Rinck, Uljana Wolf
- 2021 Eugeniusz Tkaczyszyn-Dycki; Uljana Wolf, Michael Zgodzay
- 2024 Diane Seuss (poet); Franz Hofner (translator)
