= Curt Meyer-Clason =

German writer and translator

Curt Meyer-Clason (19 September 1910 – 13 January 2012) was a German writer and translator.

== Biography ==
Meyer-Clason was born in Ludwigsburg in September 1910. After graduating from high school, Meyer-Clason worked as a commercial clerk in Bremen and from 1936 as an independent businessman in Argentina and Brazil. From 1942 to 1944, he was interned in Brazil as an illegal alien. In 1955 he went back to Germany and worked as a freelance book editor in Munich. From the sixties, his work concentrated on working on translations of Portuguese, Spanish and Latin American books – notably numerous books by Gabriel García Márquez including One Hundred Years of Solitude. From 1969 to 1976 Meyer-Clason acted as head of the Goethe Institute in Lisbon.

Curt Meyer-Clason was a member of the Association of German Writers, the PEN Center of the Federal Republic of Germany, and a corresponding member of the Academia Brasileira de Letras in Rio de Janeiro. He received the following awards: 1975 Translation Prize of the German Academy for Language and Literature, 1978 Translation Prize of the Cultural Committee of the Federal Association of German Industry (BDI) and in 1996 the Federal Merit 1st Class.

As of 2008, Meyer-Clason was living in Munich and in 2011 he turned 100. He died in Munich in January 2012 at the age of 101.

== Works ==
- Literatura alemana actual, Asunción 1969
- Erstens die Freiheit, Wuppertal 1978
- Portugiesische Tagebücher, Königstein/Ts. 1979
- Äquator, Bergisch Gladbach 1986
- Unterwegs, Bergisch Gladbach 1989
- Die Menschen sterben nicht, sie werden verzaubert, München [u. a.] 1990
- Die große Insel, Reicheneck 1995
- Der Unbekannte, München 1999
- Bin gleich wieder da, Weitra 2000
