= Adrian Constantin =

Romanian-Austrian mathematician

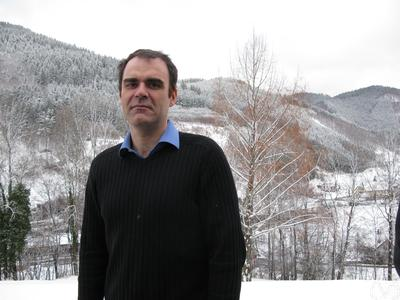
- Born: 22 April 1970 (age 56); Timișoara, Romania
- Education: University of Nice Sophia Antipolis; New York University
- Known for: nonlinear partial differential equations
- Awards: Bessel Prize (2007); Wittgenstein Award (2020)
- Scientific career
- Fields: Mathematics
- Workplaces: Newcastle University; University of Lund; Trinity College Dublin; King's College London; University of Vienna
- Thesis: The Periodic Problem for the Camassa–Holm equation (1996)
- Doctoral advisor: Henry McKean

Adrian Constantin (born 22 April 1970) is a Romanian-Austrian mathematician who does research in the field of nonlinear partial differential equations. He is a professor at the University of Vienna and has made groundbreaking contributions to the mathematics of wave propagation. He is listed as an ISI Highly Cited Researcher with more than 160 publications and 11,000 citations.

== Life and career ==
Adrian Constantin was born in Timișoara, Romania, where he studied at the Nikolaus Lenau High School. He was later educated at the University of Nice Sophia Antipolis (BSc 1991, MSc 1992) and at New York University (NYU), where he got his PhD in 1996 under Henry McKean with the thesis "The Periodic Problem for the Camassa–Holm equation". He did post-doctoral work at the University of Basel and at the University of Zurich.

After a short period as a lecturer at the University of Newcastle upon Tyne, he became a professor at the University of Lund in 2000, and then was Erasmus Smith's Professor of Mathematics at Trinity College Dublin (TCD) from 2004 to 2008, and was made a fellow in 2005. Since then he has been university professor for partial differential equations at the University of Vienna, and also had a chair at King's College London during the period 2011–2014.

Constantin specializes in the role of mathematics in geophysics using nonlinear partial differential equations to mathematically model currents and waves in the oceans and in the atmosphere. These flows and waves play an important role in the El Niño climate phenomenon and in natural disasters such as tsunamis. His approach takes into account the fact that the surface of the earth is curved and the importance of the Coriolis force.

== Awards and honours ==
- 2000: Highly Cited Researcher with more than 160 publications and 11,000 citations
- 2005: Göran Gustafsson Prize from the Royal Swedish Academy of Sciences
- 2007: Friedrich Wilhelm Bessel Research Prize from the Alexander von Humboldt Foundation
- 2009: Fluid Dynamics Research Prize from the Japan Society of Fluid Mechanics
- 2010: Advanced Grant from the European Research Council (ERC)
- 2012: Plenary lecture at the European Congress of Mathematicians (ECM) in Krakow
- 2020: Wittgenstein Award from The Austrian Ministry for Science
- 2022: Elected corresponding member of the Austrian Academy of Sciences, 22 April 2022
- 2022: Elected member of the German National Academy of Sciences Leopoldina, 16 March 2022
- 2022: Made an honorary citizen of the city of Timișoara
- 2024: Elected full member of the Austrian Academy of Sciences, 15 April 2024

== Selected publications ==
papers

- 1998: Wave breaking for nonlinear nonlocal shallow water equations (with J. Escher), Acta Mathematica 181 229–243.
- 1999: A shallow water equation on the circle (with H. P. McKean), Comm. Pure Appl. Math. 52 949–982.
- 2000: Stability of peakons (with W. Strauss), Comm. Pure Appl. Math. 53 603–610.
- 2004: Exact steady periodic water waves with vorticity (with W. Strauss), Comm. Pure Appl. Math. 57 481–527.
- 2006: The trajectories of particles in Stokes waves, Invent. Math. 166 523–535.
- 2007: Global conservative solutions of the Camassa-Holm equation (with A. Bressan), Arch. Ration. Mech. Anal. 183 215–239.
- 2011: Analyticity of periodic traveling free surface water waves with vorticity (with J. Escher), Ann. of Math. 173 559–568.
- 2016: Global bifurcation of steady gravity water waves with critical layers (with W. Strauss and E. Varvaruca), Acta Mathematica 217 195–262.
- 2019: Equatorial wave-current interactions (with R. I. Ivanov), Comm. Math. Phys. 370 1–48.
- 2022: On the propagation of nonlinear waves in the atmosphere (with R. S. Johnson), Proceedings of the Royal Society A 478 (2260), 20210895
- 2022: Stratospheric planetary flows from the perspective of the Euler equation on a rotating sphere (with P. Germain), Arch. Ration. Mech. Anal., (245 587–644)

Books

- 2011: "Nonlinear Water Waves with Applications to Wave-Current Interactions and Tsunamis", Society for Industrial and Applied Mathematics, Philadelphia, ISBN 978-1611971866
- 2016: "Fourier Analysis. Part 1. Theory", London Mathematical Society, Cambridge University Press, ISBN 978-1107044104
- 2024: "Analysis I", Springer Spektrum, Berlin, Heidelberg, ISBN 978-3-662-68219-7
