= Steffen Popp =

- Born: 18 July 1978 (age 48); Greifswald, East Germany
- Education: TU Dresden; Humboldt University of Berlin
- Occupations: Poet, novelist

Steffen Popp (born 18 July 1978 in Greifswald) is a German poet, novelist and literary translator. He grew up in Dresden, where he attended the Martin Anderson Nexö Academy of natural science. He later studied at the German Literary Institute in Leipzig, then studied literature and philosophy at the Technical University in Dresden and at Humboldt University in Berlin.

Popp has published the poetry collections Like the Alps (2004), Colonies of the Sun (2008), Thicket with Speech and Eyes (2012), and 118 (2077), all to critical acclaim. He received the Peter Huchel Prize for Thickets with Speech and Eyes; 118 was shortlisted for a prize at the Leipzig Book Fair (2017). Popp's poems have been translated into many languages and appear in numerous anthologies.

His novel Ohrenberg, or the Way There appeared in 2006 and received much critical notice. It was nominated for the German Book Prize.

Popp has translated the American poets Elizabeth Bishop, Christian Hawkey, H.D., and Ben Lerner.

In 2018 Popp was inducted into the German Academy for Language and Poetry. In the summer semester of 2022 he was the Thomas Kling visiting poet at Bonn's Friedrich Wilhelms University. In the spring of 2025 he was elected to the Academy of Science and Literature in Mainz.

Steffen Popp lives in Berlin.

== Awards ==
- 2003: Preisträger der Akademie Graz
- 2004: Kranichsteiner Literaturpreis
- 2006: Nominierung zum Deutschen Buchpreis
- 2010: Förderungspreis zum Kunstpreis Berlin
- 2011: Leonce-und-Lena-Preis
- 2011: Preis der Stadt Münster für Europäische Poesie for his translations of Ben Lerner
