= Walter Alexander Strauss =

American mathematician

Walter Alexander Strauss (born 1937) is an American applied mathematician, specializing in partial differential equations and nonlinear waves. His research interests include partial differential equations, mathematical physics, stability theory, solitary waves, kinetic theory of plasmas, scattering theory, water waves, and dispersive waves.

== Education and career ==
Strauss graduated in 1958 with an A.B. in mathematics from Columbia University and in 1959 with an M.S. from the University of Chicago. He received his Ph.D. from the Massachusetts Institute of Technology in 1962. His thesis was titled Scattering for hyperbolic equations and was supervised by Irving Segal. Strauss was a postdoctoral researcher for the academic year 1962–1963 at the University of Paris. He was a visiting assistant professor from 1963 to 1966 at Stanford University. At Brown University he was an associate professor from 1966 to 1971 and a full professor from 1971 to the present.

Strauss has done research on "scattering theory in electromagnetism and acoustics, stability of waves, relativistic Yang-Mills theory, kinetic theory of plasmas, theory of fluids, and water waves."

He has visited, for a semester or more, each of the following: C.U.N.Y., U. of Paris, University of Tokyo, M.I.T., University of Maryland, Yunnan University, Courant Institute (NYU), University of Houston, Inst. H. Poincare (Paris), Duke University and the Mittag-Leffler Institute (Sweden). During 2000-2007 he was the Editor-in-Chief of the SIAM Journal on Mathematical Analysis. Strauss is the author of more than 100 research articles and two books.

== Awards and honors ==
- 1971 — Guggenheim Fellow
- 1998 — Brown University conference held in honor of Strauss's 60th birthday
- 2009 — Fellow of the Society for Industrial and Applied Mathematics
- 2012 — Fellow of the American Mathematical Society
- 2013 — Member of the American Academy of Arts and Sciences

== Selected publications ==
=== Articles ===
- Walter A. Strauss (1968). Decay and asymptotics for □u = F(u). Journal of Functional Analysis 2(4): 409-457. 217 citations.
- Walter A. Strauss (1977). Existence of solitary waves in higher dimensions. Communications in Mathematical Physics. 55(2): 149-162. 1837 citations.
- Robert T. Glassey; Walter A. Strauss (1986). Singularity formation in a collisionless plasma could occur only at high velocities. Archive for Rational Mechanics and Analysis 92: 59–90. 239 citations.
- Manoussos Grillakis; Jalal Shatah; Walter Strauss (1987). Stability theory of solitary waves in the presence of symmetry, I. Journal of Functional Analysis 74(1): 160-197. 1391 citations.
- Yan Guo; Walter A. Strauss (1998). Unstable BGK solitary waves and collisionless shocks. Communications in Mathematical Physics. 195: 267–293.
- Adrian Constantin; Walter Strauss (2004). Exact steady periodic water waves with vorticity. Communications on Pure and Applied Mathematics. 57(4): 481-527. This paper has 384 citations.
- Walter A. Strauss; Yilun Wu (2019). Rapidly rotating stars. Communications in Mathematical Physics. 368: 701–721.

=== Books ===
- Strauss, Walter A. (1989). Nonlinear wave equations. Regional conference series in mathematics, no. 73. Providence, R.I.: American Mathematical Society. ISBN 978-0-8218-0725-5; 91 pages
- Strauss, Walter A. (21 December 2007). Partial Differential Equations: An Introduction (2nd ed.). John Wiley & Sons. ISBN 978-0-470-05456-7. (1st edition, 1990)
- Solutions Manual for: Partial Differential Equations: An Introduction, Wiley and Sons, New York, 2008, with J. Lewandowsky and S. Lewandowsky.

== Recent Papers ==
1. Proof of modulational instability of Stokes waves in deep water, submitted, with Huy Q. Nguyen.
2. Steady states of gas ionization with secondary emission, Meth. & Applies. of Anal. (2020), with Masahiro Suzuki.
3. Rapidly rotating white dwarfs, Nonlinearity (2020), with Yilun Wu.
4. Large-amplitude stationary solutions of the Morrow model of gas ionization, Kinetic Rel. Mod. 12 (2019), 1297-1312, with Masahiro Suzuki.
5. Large-amplitude steady downstream water waves, submitted, with A. Constantin and E. Varvaruca.
6. Rapidly rotating stars, Comm. Math. Phys. 368 (2019), 701-721, with Yilun Wu.
7. Existence of rotating magnetic stars, Physics D 397 (2019), 65-74, with Juhi Jang and Yilun Wu.
8. Upper bound on the slope of steady water waves with small adverse vorticity J. Diff. Eqns. 264 (2018), 4136-4151, with Seung Wook So.
9. Steady states of rotating stars and galaxies, SIAM J. Math. Anal. 49 (2017), 4865-4914, with Yilun Wu.
10. Global bifurcation of steady gravity water waves with critical layers, Acta Math. 217 (2016), 195-262, with A. Constantin and E. Varvaruca.
11. Bound on the slope of steady water waves with favorable vorticity, Arch. Rat. Mech. Anal. 222 (2016), 1555-1580, with M. Wheeler.
12. Global bifurcation theory for periodic traveling interfacial gravity-capillary waves with critical layers, Ann. IHP (Anal. NL) 33 (2016), 1081-1101, with D. Ambrose and D. Wright.
13. Convergence to equilibrium of a body moving in a kinetic sea, SIAM J. Math. Anal. 47 (2016), 4630-4651, with X. Chen.
14. Global magnetic confinement for the 1.5D Vlasov-Maxwell system, Kinetic \& Rel. Models 8 (2015), 153-168, with T.T. Nguyen and T. V. Nguyen.
15. Stationary solutions of the Vlasov-Poisson system with diffusive boundary conditions, J. Nonlin. Sci. 25 (2015), 315-342, with E. Esenturk and H. J. Hwang.
16. Velocity reversal criterion of a body immersed in a sea of particles, Comm. Math. Phys. 338 (2015), 139-168, with Xuwen Chen.
17. Approach to equilibrium of a body colliding specularly and diffusely with a sea of particles, Arch. Rat. Mech. Anal. 211 (2014), 879-910, with Xuwen Chen.
18. Linear stability analysis of a hot plasma in a solid torus, Arch. Rat. Mech. Anal. 211 (2014), 619-672, with T. Nguyen.
19. Stability analysis of collision less plasmas with specularly reflecting boundary, SIAM J. Math. Anal. 45 (2013), 777-808, with T. Nguyen.
20. Vorticity jumps in steady water waves, Disc. Cont. Dyn. Sys.-B 17 (2012), 1101-1113.
21. Notes on stability theory, https://www.math.brown.edu/~wstrauss/StabilityTutorial2014.pdf
22. Periodic traveling gravity waves with discontinuous vorticity, Arch. Rat. Mech. Anal. 202 (2011), 133-175, with A. Constantin.
23. Steady water waves, Bull. AMS. 47 (2010), 671-694.
24. Transport of interfaces with surface tension by 2D viscous flows, Interfaces and Free Boundaries 12 (2010), 23-44, with D. Ambrose, M. Lopes Filho and H. Nussenzveig Lopes.
25. Pressure and trajectories beneath a Stokes wave, Comm. Pure Appl. Math. 63 (2010), 533-557, with A. Constantin.
26. Analyticity of the scattering operator for fourth-order nonlinear waves, Disc. Cont. Dyn. Sys. 25 (2009), 617-625, with B. Pausader.
27. Trochoidal solutions to the incompressible two-dimensional Euler equations, J. Math. Fluid Mech. 12 (2010), 181-201, with A. Constantin.
28. Effect of vorticity on steady water waves, J. Fluid Mech. 608 (2008), 197-215, with J. Ko.
29. A sharp stability criterion for the Vlasov-Maxwell system, Inventions Math. 173 (2008), 497-546, with Z. Lin.
30. Large-amplitude steady rotational water waves, Eur. J. Mech. B Fluids 27 (2008), 96-109, with J. Ko.
31. Instability of steady states for nonlinear wave and heat equations, J. Diff. Eqns. 241 (2007), 184-205, with P. Karageorgis.
32. Rotational steady water waves near stagnation, Phil. Trans. Roy. Soc. 365 (2007), 2227-2239, with A. Constantin.
33. Stability properties of steady water waves with vorticity, Comm. Pure Appl. Math. 60 (2007), 911-950, with A. Constantin.
34. Linear stability and instability of relativistic Vlasov-Maxwell systems, Comm. Pure Appl. Math. 60 (2007), 724-787, with Zhiwu Lin.
35. Nonlinear stability and instability of relativistic Vlasov-Maxwell systems, Comm. Pure Appl. Math. 60 (2007), 789-837, with Zhiwu Lin.
36. Variational formulations of steady water waves with vorticity, J. Fluid Mech. 548 (2006), 151-163, with A. Constantin and D. Sattinger.
37. Stability of semiconductor states with insulating and contact boundary conditions, Arch. Rat. Mech. Anal. 179 (2005), 1-30, with Y. Guo.
38. Exact steady periodic water waves with vorticity, Comm. Pure Appl. Math. 57 (2004), 481-527, with A. Constantin.
39. Nonlinear instability of dispersive waves, in: T. Kato's method and principle for evolution equations in math. physics, Yurinsha, Tokyo (2002), 173-178.
40. Exact periodic traveling waves with vorticity, C. R. Acad. Sci. Paris 335 (2002), 797-800. with A. Constantin.
41. Irving Segal's work in partial differential equations, J. Funct. Anal. 190 (2002), 25-28 (in memory of I. E. Segal).
42. Stable and unstable ideal plane flows, Chinese Annals Math. 23B (2002), 149-164, with C. Bardos and Y. Guo (in memory of J. L. Lions).
43. Instability of traveling waves of the Kuramoto-Sivashinsky equation, Chinese Annals Math. 23B (2002), 267-276, with Guanxiang Wang (in memory of J. L. Lions).
44. Stability of the Camassa-Holm solitons, J. Nonlin. Sci. 12 (2002), 415-422, with A. Constantin.
45. Time decay for the nonlinear beam equation, Meth. & Applies. of Analysis 7 (2001), 479-488, with S. Lewandowsky (dedicated to C. S. Morawetz).
46. Magnetically created instability in a collision less plasma, J. de Math's. Pures et Applies. 79, 10 (2000), 975-1009, with Y. Guo.
47. Stability of a class of solitary waves in elastic compressible rods, Phys. Lett. A 270 (2000), 140-148, with A. Constantin.
48. Regular solutions of the Vlasov-Poisson-Fokker-Planck system, Discrete & Cont. Dyn. Sys. 6 (2000), 751-772, with K. Ono.
49. Stability of peakons, Comm. Pure Appl. Math. 53 (2000), 603-610, with A. Constantin.
50. Spectral condition for instability, Contemp. Math. 255 (2000), 189-198, with J. Shatah.
51. An inhomogeneous boundary value problem for nonlinear Schrodinger equations, J. Diff. Eqns. 173 (2001), 79-91, with C. Bu.
52. Perturbation of essential spectra of evolution operators and the Vlasov- Poisson-Boltzmann system, Discrete & Cont. Dyn. Sys. 5 (1999), 457-472, with R. Glassey.
53. Robustness of instability for the two-dimensional Euler equations, SIAM J. Math. Anal. 30 (1999), 1343-1354, with S. Friedlander and M. Vishik.
54. Unstable oscillatory-tail waves in collision less plasmas, SIAM J. Math. Anal. 30 (1999), 1076-1114, with Y. Guo.
55. Decay of the linearized Boltzmann-Vlasov system, Trans. Th. Stat. Phys. 28, 135-156, with R. Glassey.
56. Stability and instability in the kinetic theory of plasmas, Mathemática Contemporanêa 15 (1999), 249-258.
57. Relativistic unstable periodic BGK waves, Comput. and Appl. Math. 18 (1999), 87-122, with Y. Guo.
58. Unstable BGK solitary waves and collision less shocks, Comm. Math. Phys. 195 (1998), 267-293, with Y. Guo.
59. Existence and blow up of small-amplitude nonlinear waves with a negative potential, Discrete & Cont. Dyn. Sys. 3 (1997), 175-188, with K. Tsutaya.
60. Stability, instability and regularity of nonlinear waves, in: Nonlinear Waves, T. Ozawa, ed., Gakuto Int'l Series, Gakkotosho, Tokyo, 1997, p. 451-468.
61. Breathers as homoclinic geometric wave maps, Physica D 99 (1996), 113-133, with J. Shatah.
62. Nonlinear instability in an ideal fluid, Annales de l'IHP (Anal. NL) 14 (1997), 187-209, with S. Friedlander and M. Vishik.
63. The relativistic Boltzmann equation, in: Quantization, Nonlinear PDEs and Operator Algebras, W. Arveson et al., eds., P.S.P.M. 59 (1996), Amer. Math. Soc., p. 203-209.
64. Microlocal dispersive smoothing for the Schrodinger equation, Comm. Pure Appl. Math. 48 (1995), 769-860, with W. Craig and T. Kappeler.
65. Instability of periodic BGK equilibria, Comm. Pure Appl. Math. 48 (1995), 861-894, with Y. Guo.
66. Global finite-energy solutions of the Maxwell-Schrodinger system, Comm. Math. Phys. 170 (1995), 181-196, with Y. Guo and K. Nakamitsu.
67. Asymptotic stability of the relativistic Maxwellian via fourteen moments, Transport Th. Stat. Phys. 24 (1995), 657-678, with R. Glassey.
