= Janheinz Jahn =

German writer (1918–1973)

Janheinz Jahn (23 July 1918 in Frankfurt on Main – 20 October 1973 in Messel, Darmstadt-Dieburg) was a German writer and influential scholar of literature from sub-Saharan Africa.

Jahn studied drama and Arabic Studies in Munich in the Thirties. After that he spent two years studying Italian art history in Perugia. In 1939 he was drafted into the Wehrmacht. Until 1946 he was in British captivity, where he worked as an interpreter.

After the war he worked as a freelance writer and speaker. In 1949 he published Diwan of Al-Andalus, a collection of adaptations of works by Hispano-Arab poets of the 10th to 13th century.

In 1951 Jahn met the Senegalese poet and future President Léopold Sédar Senghor in Frankfurt on Main. After that he devoted himself to the collection of African literature of Negritude, which he acquainted himself with through bibliographies, translations and essays. From 1966 to 1968 he was Secretary General of the German PEN clubs. Senghor appointed him Senegal's honorary consul.

Of all his intellectual contributions, the one for which Jahn attained worldwide renown is Muntu: Umrisse der neoafrikanische Kultur (in English "Muntu: An Outline of Neo-African Culture.") It was first published in German in 1958. The English translation "Muntu: African Culture and the Western World" was first published in 1961 by Grove Press. The New York Times called the book "...a rare piece of scholarship..." (Faber and Faber published the book in London in 1961 under the title "Muntu: An Outline of Neo-African Culture.")

In 1968 Jahn's wife Edith committed suicide, possibly taking the lives of their two children Aurel and Domini. In the aftermath Jahn lived in partnership with the literary scholar Ulla Schild (1938–1998).

In 1970 he was awarded the Johann Heinrich Voss Prize for Translation of the German Academy for Language and Literature .

Jahn died in October 1973 of a heart attack at his home in Messel.

His personal estate now belongs to the Department of African Studies of the Humboldt University of Berlin. At the Department of Anthropology and African Studies of the University of Mainz is the Jahn Library for African Literatures, which was supervised until 1998 by Ulla Schild and Janheinz Jahns provided its book collection's foundation.

== Bibliography (selection) ==
- Jahn, Janheinz, 1954: Schwarzer Orpheus. Moderne Dichtung afrikanischer Völker beider Hemisphären. Munich: Carl Hanser.
- Jahn, Janheinz, 1954: "Verblüffende Wirkung eines Lyrikbandes: 600 Briefe an die Neger aller Kontinente". Die Welt, 25 November.
- Jahn, Janheinz, 1958: Muntu: Umrisse der neoafrikanischen Kultur. Düsseldorf: Eugen Diederichs.
- Jahn, Janheinz, 1960: Durch Afrikanische Türen. Düsseldorf, Eugen Diederichs. 1962: In English as Through African Doors. London, Faber & Faber
- Jahn, Janheinz, 1965: Die neoafrikanische Literatur: Gesamtbibliographie von den Anfängen bis zur Gegenwart. Düsseldorf: Eugen Diederichs.
- Jahn, Janheinz, 1966: Geschichte der neoafrikanischen Literatur: Eine Einführung. Düsseldorf: Eugen Diederichs.
- Jahn, Janheinz, 1968: "Meine erste Begegnung mit Senghor". Darmstädter Echo, 20 September.
- Jahn, Janheinz and Claus Peter Dressler, 1971: Bibliography of Creative African Writing. Nendeln, Liechtenstein: Kraus Reprint.
- Jahn, Janheinz, Ulla Schild and Almut Nordmann, 1972: Who's Who in African Literature. Biographies, Works, Commentaries. Tübingen: Horst Erdmann.
