= Traugott König =

German translator

Traugott König (born 22 September 1934 in Bunzlau; died 9 July 1991 in Frankfurt am Main) was a German translator.

== Life ==
Traugott König was the son of a pastor. He attended high school in the GDR and later studied Romance languages and philosophy at the Free University of Berlin. From 1970 onwards, he lived in Frankfurt am Main.

Traugott König translated literary and philosophical texts from French since the 1960s. He was the editor of the German complete edition of Jean-Paul Sartre's works, which also included König's major works, the translations of Sartre's The Family Idiot – Gustave Flaubert, 1821-57, and Being and Nothingness. In 1978, Traugott König received the Helmut M. Braem Translation Prize for his translations of Sartre. In July 1987, he organized the highly successful international congress on Sartre at Frankfurt University, and in 1988 he was awarded the Johann Heinrich Voß Prize by the German Academy for Language and Literature in Darmstadt.

== Works ==
- Traduire Sartre en allemand, Lausanne 1989

== Editorship ==
- Jules Michelet: Die Hexe, München 1974
- Jean-Paul Sartre: Sartre über Sartre, Reinbek 1977
- Jean-Paul Sartre: Was kann Literatur?, Reinbek 1979
- Sartres Flaubert lesen, Reinbek 1980
- Jean-Paul Sartre: Artikel, Aufrufe, Pamphlete, Reinbek 1982
- Jean-Paul Sartre: Reden, Polemiken, Stellungnahmen, Reinbek 1982 (with Dietrich Hoss)
- Jean-Paul Sartre: Schwarze und weiße Literatur, Reinbek 1984
- Jean-Paul Sartre: Sartre-Lesebuch, Reinbek 1986
- Jean-Paul Sartre: Wir sind alle Mörder, Reinbek 1988
- Sartre – ein Kongress, Reinbek 1988

== Translations ==
- Roland Barthes: Die Lust am Text, Frankfurt 1974
- Georges Bataille: Das theoretische Werk, München (with Heinz Abosch)
  - 1. Die Aufhebung der Ökonomie, 1975
- Frantz Fanon: Die Verdammten dieser Erde, Frankfurt a. M. 1966
- Gustave Flaubert: Jugendwerke, Zürich 1980
- Gustave Flaubert: November, Zürich, 1982
- Claude Lévi-Strauss: Rasse und Geschichte, Frankfurt 1972
- André Maurois: Die Geschichte der USA von Wilson bis Kennedy, Reinbek 1965
- Henri Michaux: Reise nach Groß-Garabannien, Frankfurt am Main 1989
- Marc Nerfin: Gespräche mit Ben Salah, Bonn 1976
- Paul Nizan: Aden. Die Wachhunde, Reinbek 1969
- Jean-Paul Sartre: Die Eingeschlossenen von Altona, Reinbek 1991
- Jean-Paul Sartre: Freud, Reinbek bei Hamburg 1995 (with Judith Klein)
- Jean-Paul Sartre: Geschlossene Gesellschaft, Reinbek 1985
- Jean-Paul Sartre: Der Idiot der Familie, Reinbek
1. Die Konstitution, 1977
2. Die Personalisation, 1, 1977
3. Die Personalisation, 2, 1978
4. Elbehnon oder Die letzte Spirale, 1978
5. Objektive und subjektive Neurose, 1980
- Jean-Paul Sartre: Kolonialismus und Neokolonialismus, Reinbek 1968 (with Monika Kind)
- Jean-Paul Sartre: Kritik der dialektischen Vernunft, Reinbek
1. Theorie der gesellschaftlichen Praxis, 1967
- Jean-Paul Sartre: Mallarmés Engagement, Reinbek 1983
- Jean-Paul Sartre: Nekrassow, Reinbek 1991
- Jean-Paul Sartre: Das Sein und das Nichts, Reinbek 1991 (with Hans Schöneberg)
- Jean-Paul Sartre: Tote ohne Begräbnis, Reinbek 1988
- Jean-Paul Sartre: Die Transzendenz des Ego, Reinbek 1982 (with Uli Aumüller, Bernd Schuppener)
- Jean-Paul Sartre: Warum ich nicht in die Vereinigten Staaten reise, Berlin 1967
- Jean-Paul Sartre: Was ist Literatur? Reinbek 1981
- Jorge Semprún: Algarabía oder Die neuen Geheimnisse von Paris, Frankfurt am Main 1985 (with Christine Delory-Momberger)
