= Manfred Fuhrmann =

German classical philologist (1925–2005)

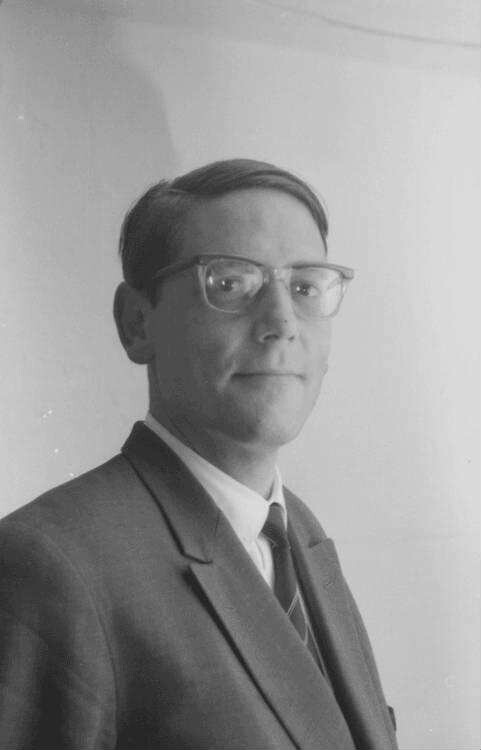
Manfred Fuhrmann

Manfred Fuhrmann (23 June 1925 – 12 January 2005) was a professor for classical Latin philology and one of the most eminent German philologists.

== Life ==
Fuhrmann was born on 23 June 1925 in Hiddesen (near Detmold). He started his studies in Leiden. While Fuhrmann wanted to study music, he gave up this plan in favour of classical philology and jurisprudence, whereby the classical philology was decisive for him. 1953 he obtained his doctorate in classical philology in Freiburg, followed by his habilitation ibidem. 1962 Fuhrmann accepted a chair at the University of Kiel, 1966 one at the University of Konstanz. Also, he was a member of the Heidelberger Akademie der Wissenschaften (academy of sciences of Heidelberg) and of the Royal Netherlands Academy of Arts and Sciences since 1990. Furthermore, the University of Freiburg gave Fuhrmann an honorary doctorate in jurisprudence. He died on 12 January 2005.

== Achievements ==
Fuhrmann is generally considered to be one of the most eminent German philologists. During his lifetime he has undoubtedly achieved a lot: Above all he has worked as a translator — having translated a huge amount of classical Latin and Ancient Greek texts into German: His probably most outstanding achievement was to translate all of Cicero's speeches. For this translation Fuhrmann received the Johann Heinrich Voß Prize in Translation from the Deutsche Akademie für Sprache und Dichtung 1990. Besides he has translated texts from other classical authors like Horace, Aristotle and Plato.

In addition to his translations, Fuhrmann became well known for his criticism of education. In his book Bildung. Europas kulturelle Identität (Education. The cultural identity of Europe) he criticised that natural sciences are much too important in the most current educational systems, whereas classical philology, history and music do not receive enough recognition.

== Literature ==
- Fuhrmann, Manfred: Der europäische Bildungskanon des bürgerlichen Zeitalters. Insel. 2004.
- Fuhrmann, Manfred: Rom in der Spätantike: Porträt einer Epoche. Artemis & Winkler. 1998.
- Fuhrmann, Manfred: Cicero: Und die römische Republik. Patmos. 2005.
- Fuhrmann, Manfred: Bildung: Europas kulturelle Identität. Reclam. 2002.
- Fuhrmann, Manfred: Die antike Rhetorik. Eine Einführung. Artemis & Winkler. 2003.
- Fuhrmann, Manfred: Latein und Europa. Die fremd gewordenen Fundamente unserer Bildung. Dumont Buchverlag. 2005.
- Fuhrmann, Manfred: Die antike Rhetorik. Patmos. 2007.
- Fuhrmann, Manfred: Geschichte der römischen Literatur. Reclam. 2005.
- Fuhrmann, Manfred: Cicero: Die catilinarischen Reden. Artemis & Winkler. 1998.
- Fuhrmann, Manfred: Aristoteles: Poetik. Reclam. 1994.
- Fuhrmann, Manfred: Platon: Apologie des Sokrates. Reclam. 1986.
- Fuhrmann, Manfred: Cicero: Die Reden gegen Verres / In C. Verrem: Erste Verhandlung. Zweite Verhandlung, viertes Buch / Actio prima. Actio secunda, liber quartus. Artemis & Winkler. 1999.

== Sources ==
- Rösler, Wolfgang. Poiss, Thomas: Zum Tod von Manfred Fuhrmann. 2005.
- "Klüger werden mit: Manfred Fuhrmann: Der 77-jährige emeritierte Latinist über Bildung". Der Spiegel. 2002.
