= Hanns Grössel =

German translator

Hanns Grössel (18 April 1932, in Leipzig – 1 August 2012, in Cologne) was a German literary translator and broadcasting journalist.

== Biography ==
He translated from Swedish, Danish, and French. He was also well known from his activities at the Westdeutscher Rundfunk.

=== Translations ===
- Peter Adolphsen: Brummstein, München [u.a.] 2005
- Peter Adolphsen: Das Herz des Urpferds, München 2008
- Jacques Berg: Herbst in der Provence, Zürich [u.a.] 1980
- Cecil Bødker: Der Widder, Einsiedeln 1966
- Cecil Bødker: Zustand Harley, Frankfurt a.M. 1969
- Jean Cau: Das Erbarmen Gottes, München 1962
- Inger Christensen: Alfabet, Münster 1988
- Inger Christensen: Azorno, Frankfurt am Main 1972
- Inger Christensen: Brev i april, Münster 1990
- Inger Christensen: Ein chemisches Gedicht zu Ehren der Erde, Salzburg [u.a.] 1997
- Inger Christensen: Det, Münster 2002
- Inger Christensen: Gedicht vom Tod, Münster 1991
- Inger Christensen: Der Geheimniszustand und das "Gedicht vom Tod", München [u.a.] 1999
- Inger Christensen: Das gemalte Zimmer, Münster 1989
- Inger Christensen: Graes, Münster 2010
- Inger Christensen: Lys, Münster 2008
- Inger Christensen: Massenhaft Schnee für die darbenden Schafe, Wien 2002
- Inger Christensen: Das Schmetterlingstal, Frankfurt am Main 1998
- Inger Christensen: Teil des Labyrinths, Münster 1993
- Dänische Erzähler der Gegenwart, Stuttgart 1970
- Petru Dumitriu: Treffpunkt Jüngstes Gericht, Frankfurt a.M. [u.a.] 1962
- Sten Forshufvud: Mord an Napoleon?, Düsseldorf [u.a.] 1962 (übersetzt zusammen mit Margarete Bormann)
- Ulrikka S. Gernes: Wo Schmetterlinge überwintern können, Berlin 2009
- Roger Gouze: Venus im Weinberg, München 1962
- Marcel Griaule: Masken der Dogon, Frankfurt am Main [u.a.] 1980
- Lars Gustafsson: Utopien, München 1970 (übersetzt zusammen mit Hans Magnus Enzensberger)
- José Maria de Heredia: Der Mensch lauscht ungerührt, Pforzheim 1983
- Sven Holm: Termush, Atlantik-Küste, Frankfurt a.M. 1970
- Søren Kierkegaard: Der Augenblick, Nördlingen 1988
- Paul Léautaud: Literarisches Tagebuch 1893–1956, Reinbek b. Hamburg 1966
- Harry Mathews: Roussel und Venedig, Berlin 1991
- Leif Panduro: Echsentage, Neuwied [u.a.] 1964
- Leif Panduro: Fern aus Dänemark, Frankfurt am Main 1972
- André Pieyre de Mandiargues: Die Monstren von Bomarzo, Reinbek b. Hamburg 1969
- André Pieyre de Mandiargues: Das Motorrad, Reinbek b. Hamburg 1965
- Lucien Rebatet: Weder Gott noch Teufel, München [u.a.] 1964
- Klaus Rifbjerg: Der schnelle Tag ist hin, Würzburg [u.a.] 1962
- Raymond Roussel: In Havanna. Als Kanevas gedachte Dokumente, Frankfurt am Main 1982
- Raymond Roussel: Nouvelles impressions d’Afrique, München 1980
- Jean-Paul Sartre: Paris unter der Besatzung, Reinbek bei Hamburg 1980
- Staffan Seeberg: Der Lungenfisch, Frankfurt am Main 1973
- Georges Simenon: Der Bürgermeister von Furnes, Zürich 1984
- Georges Simenon: Die Witwe Couderc, Zürich 1982
- Villy Sørensen: Apolls Aufruhr, München 1991
- Villy Sørensen: Vormundserzählungen, Frankfurt a.M. 1968
- Jørgen Sonne: Gedichte, Heidelberg 1996
- Tomas Tranströmer: Einunddreißig Gedichte, Stade 2002
- Tomas Tranströmer: Die Erinnerungen sehen mich, München [u.a.] 1999
  - als Hörbuch, gelesen von Michael Krüger, Hörbuch Verlag, Hamburg 2011, 2 CD, 109 min. ISBN 978-3-89903-370-0.
- Tomas Tranströmer: Für Lebende und Tote, München [u.a.] 1993
- Tomas Tranströmer: Gedichte, München [u.a.] 1981
- Tomas Tranströmer: Das große Rätsel, München [u.a.] 2005
- Tomas Tranströmer: Der Mond und die Eiszeit, München [u.a.] 1992
- Tomas Tranströmer: Sämtliche Gedichte, München [u.a.] 1997
- Tomas Tranströmer: Schmetterlingsmuseum, Leipzig 1992
- Tomas Tranströmer: Der wilde Marktplatz, München [u.a.] 1985
- Leonora Christina Ulfeldt: Jammers Minde, München 1968
- Poul Vad: Islandreise, München [u.a.] 1998
- Boris Vian: Die kapieren nicht, Frankfurt am Main 1980

== Awards ==
- Petrarca-Preis (1993)
- Preis der Stadt Münster für Europäische Poesie (1995)
- Europäischer Übersetzerpreis Offenburg (2010)
