= Phoenix (Romanian band) =

Romanian rock band

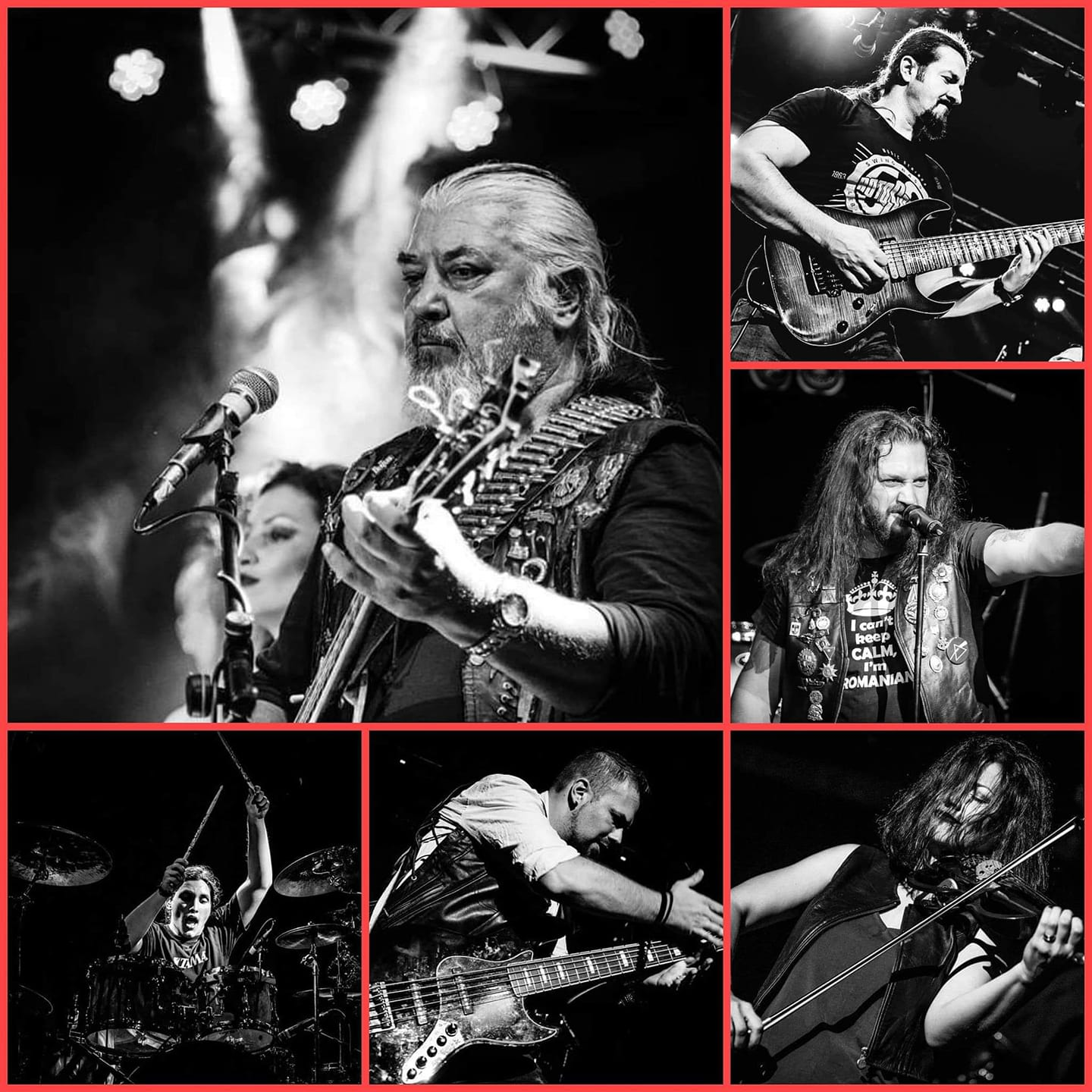
- From top-left, clockwise: Nicu Covaci, Cristi Gram, Costin Adam, Lavinia Săteanu, Vlady Săteanu, Flavius Hosu

Background information
- Also known as: Transsylvania Phoenix; The Saints
- Origin: Timișoara, Romania
- Years active: 1962–present
- Labels: Electrecord; Bellaphon Records; Bacillus Records; Extra Records & Tapes; Eurostar; Genius CD; Unimedia Records; Cat Music; Phoenix Records; Zone Records; Roton; Fangorn Acoustic; DB Schenker
- Members: Cristi Gram; Costin Adam; Flavius Hosu; Vlady Săteanu; Lavinia Săteanu
- Past members: See: List of Phoenix (Romanian band) members

Phoenix (also known as Trupa Phoenix in Romania) or for a short time Sfinții ( The Saints) is a Romanian rock band formed in 1962 in Timișoara by guitarists Nicu Covaci and Kamocsa Béla. Guitarist Claudiu Rotaru, vocalist Florin "Moni" Bordeianu and drummer Ioan "Pilu" Ștefanovici completed the early lineup. The group became famous in Romania in the 1970s when it started fusing their 1960s rock and roll sound with traditional folk music, thus pioneering the "ethno rock" subgenre.

After gaining popularity in Romania during the so-called British Invasion in the mid-1960s, the group changed its style to integrate Romanian folklore elements after vocalist Florin "Moni" Bordeianu emigrated to the United States. A new LP was released in 1972 and the band represented Romania in various Eastern Bloc music festivals throughout the 1970s. The group disbanded in 1977, when they illegally fled to West Germany. Latter attempts to regroup the members, both in West Germany and in Romania after 1990, failed to achieve the original success. They have been estimated to have sold over 2 million albums in Romania.

== History ==
=== Origins ===
Phoenix was launched in the cosmopolitan city of Timișoara in 1962 by a pair of schoolboys: Nicu Covaci and Béla Kamocsa, under the name of Sfinții (The Saints). In their first years, together with Florin "Moni" Bordeianu (born 1948), they performed in school contests and at local clubs, covering Western music hits from The Rolling Stones, The Beatles, The Who, etc., and they quickly became very popular among the youth. In 1965 the Communist authorities demanded that the band stop performing under the name The Saints, because of the religious innuendo that the name carried. Forced to comply, the band took the name Phoenix. Nicu Covaci also changed the composition of the band, around 1963, by adding Claudiu Rotaru, Ioan "Pilu" Ștefanovici (born 1946) and Günther "Spitzly" Reininger (born 1950) to the lineup.

In 1965 they had their first big concert in Bucharest. Their performance brought a collaboration with Cornel Chiriac to record some of their songs. The first songs they recorded were "Știu că mă iubesti și tu" ("I Know You Love Me Too"), "Dunăre, Dunăre" ("Danube, Danube") and "Bun e vinul ghiurghiuliu" ("Good is the Red Wine"). The same year also marked the beginning of their collaboration with Victor Suvagau, who went on to write many of their most famous songs, such as "Vremuri" ("Old Times"), "Și totuși ca voi sunt" ("And Yet I Am Like You"), "Nebunul cu ochii închiși" ("The Fool with Eyes Closed"), "Floarea stîncilor" ("Mountain Flower") and "Canarul" ("Canary").

In December 1967 Phoenix had their first major series of concerts in many western cities, capped off by two huge concerts in Timișoara. After winning a few prizes in national students' contests, held at Iași the following year, in 1968 they recorded their first EP, Vremuri, containing two original songs, Vremuri and Canarul, and two covers (Lady Madonna – The Beatles and "Friday on My Mind" – The Easybeats). A second EP would follow one year later, named Floarea stîncilor (The Flower of the Rocks), with all four songs being original compositions. Both albums sport a sound reminiscent of the beat style popular in those days.

They then started working on a rock theater play "Omul 36/80" (The Man 36/80) which won several prizes for originality.

In 1969 Ioan "Pilu" Ștefanovici was replaced by Dorel "Baba" Vintilă Zaharia (born 1943). For the next year the band became more and more popular, frequently visiting Bucharest and being invited onto talk shows about music.

=== The 1970s ===
In 1970, Moni Bordeianu emigrated to the United States. 1970 was the blues period of the band. The band was Nicu Covaci, guitar, Günther "Spitzly" Reininger, piano and vocals, Zoltán Kovács, bass guitar and Liviu Butoi, oboe and flute. Phoenix was born again the next year, with Covaci, Josef Kappl, Mircea Baniciu, Costin Petrescu (replaced in 1974 by Ovidiu Lipan, nicknamed "Țăndărică") and Valeriu Sepi.

But the Communist officials were not very comfortable with the Western-style music that they were singing, and kept creating problems for them. So Phoenix abandoned beat and turned to Romanian folklore, pagan rituals, mystic animals and old traditions. In this same year, Phoenix started a collaboration with the Institute of Ethnography and Folklore and the Folklore section of Timișoara University on an ambitious project, a rock poem that combined traditional wooden instruments with modern sounds. During this project the band also started collaborating with Valeriu Sepi (born 1947), who eventually joined the band. The first outcome would be the 1972 LP Cei ce ne-au dat nume (Those Who Gave Us a Name) – the second LP to be recorded in Romania by a Romanian band. Two years later, Mugur de fluier (Flute Bud) followed. Both albums underwent severe censorship.

Phoenix – 1974. From left to right: Costin Petrescu, Valeriu Sepi, Nicu Covaci, Ioji Kappl, Corneliu „Schwartz” Calboreanu (back), Günther Reininger, Mircea Baniciu (front)

In 1973 Phoenix represented Romania at the "Golden Harp" festival in Bratislava (Slovakia), and then at the "Disc festival" in Sopot (Poland). Also, they wanted to record a new rock-opera, named "Meșterul Manole", but the communist officials censored it all, by "losing" the only existing book with costume sketches and lyrics given to them for official approval. The result was only an EP with an extract from the opera, Meșterul Manole, uvertură (Master Manole, overture) and two older songs, Mamă, Mamă (Mother, Mother) and Te întreb pe tine, soare... (I'm asking you, sun...).

On Monday, 19 November 1973, Phoenix held a concert in Bucharest, presenting their new hits "Andrii Popa", "Pavel Chinezu", "Mica Țiganiadă" and "Strunga" which composed the new disc "Mugur de fluier". The new songs were still influenced by folklore yet had a new style. This style was the result of the collaboration with new lyricists Andrei Ujică and Șerban Foarță. Based on those new songs Nicu Covaci created a new show "Introducere la un concert despre muzica veche la români" ("Introduction to a concert about old Romanian music") in which he introduced violins, flutes, archaic percussion and other traditional instruments. The show was never finished due to a new collaboration with "Cenaclul Flacăra".

Every winter the members of the band would retreat to Mount Semenic and plan their upcoming songs. That winter the show "Zoosophia", a title that would later change to "Cantafabule", was created. The show began by "calling" all mythic animals and continued by dedicating a song to each of them, finishing with the Phoenix, the band's symbol. The year 1975 brought a newcomer to the band, Ovidiu Lipan "Țăndărică" (born 1953). The "Cantafabule" show was first presented in Timișoara in February 1975. The disc was recorded in a short time and was published the same year with a misspelled title: "Cantofabule."

By this time, Phoenix had become quite popular, both for the songs and the thinly veiled allusions to the Communist regime. The band members, especially Nicu Covaci, were increasingly harassed by the Securitate. Covaci married a Dutch woman and left the country in 1976. He returned in 1977, bringing in relief aid for those struck by the powerful earthquake on 4 March. After two grandiose concerts in Constanța and Tulcea, Covaci left the country again, this time with all the band members (except Baniciu) hidden inside their Marshall speakers: at the time it was extremely difficult to obtain approval to travel abroad and illegal border crossing was punished by imprisonment.

=== The 1980s ===
After fleeing Communist Romania in 1977 via Yugoslavia and after ultimately arriving in West Germany, Phoenix shortly thereafter disbanded. Kappl and a few other members (i.e. Erlend Krauser and Ovidiu Lipan) formed a new band called Madhouse and released a less successful album entitled From The East. In 1981, Covaci co-opted Neumann and Lipan and English bassist Tom Buggie, under the name Transsylvania Phoenix (since a band named Phoenix already existed) and released an LP named Transsylvania, containing two old Phoenix songs translated into English to target the Western audience and five new ones. Covaci together with Kappl also released two EPs and one maxi single as Transsylvania-Phoenix.

=== Comeback ===
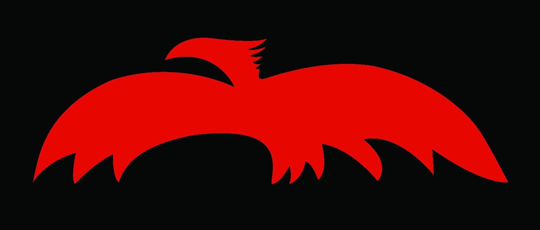
The band's official logo (since 1994) depicting the mythological bird Phoenix was created by Nicolae Covaci.

In 1990, Phoenix made a modest comeback to Romania. Although they were expected to sing their first song in their hometown Timișoara, the city that sparked the Romanian Revolution of 1989 that eventually led to the downfall of the Communist regime, their first post-1989 concert took place in Bucharest, the capital of Romania. Internal conflicts, especially between Covaci and Baniciu, were making headlines in the media.

A new studio album was released in 2000, the first original album after their 1990 comeback attempt; with the exception of Covaci, the lineup comprised none of the members from the '70s.

In 2002, the 40th anniversary of the band brought together some of the former members.

At the end of 2005 the band released a new album, named Baba Novak, in its classic gold lineup.

As of 2010, the band still performed at live events. In 2014, they recorded the album called "Vino, Țepeș!".

== Band members ==
For more details on this topic, see List of Phoenix (Romanian band) members:

- Costin Adam – lead vocals 2014–present
- Cristi Gram – lead guitar, backing vocals 2004–2014, 2015–prezent
- Vlady Sateanu – bass guitar 2016–present
- Flavius Hosu – drums 2014–present
- Lavinia Săteanu – violin 2017–present

== Discography ==
- Vremuri (Old Times), 1968, EP
- Floarea stîncilor (The Flower of the Rocks), 1969, EP
- Cei ce ne-au dat nume (Those Who Gave Us a Name), 1972, LP (re-edited on CD in 1999)
- Meșterul Manole, 1973, EP
- Mugur de fluier (Flute Bud), 1974, LP (re-edited on CD in 1999)
- Cantofabule (Fablesongs), 1975, 2LP
- Transsylvania, 1981, LP
- Ballade For You/The Lark, 1987, single
- Tuareg/Mr. G's Promises, 1988, single
- Tuareg, 1988, maxi-single
- Ciocîrlia/Perestroika (The Lark/Perestroika), 1990, single
- Remember Phoenix, 1991, LP
- SymPhoenix/Timișoara, 1992, CD/MC/2LP
- Evergreens, 1993, CD/MC
- Cantafabule – Bestiar, 1996, CD
- Anniversare 35 (35th Anniversary), 1997, CD/MC
- Vremuri, anii '60... (Old Times, The 60s), 1998, CD/MC
- În umbra marelui urs, 2000
- Baba Novak, 2005
- Back to the Future, 2008
- Vino, Țepeș!, 2014
