= Anne Weber =

German-French author and translator (born 1964)

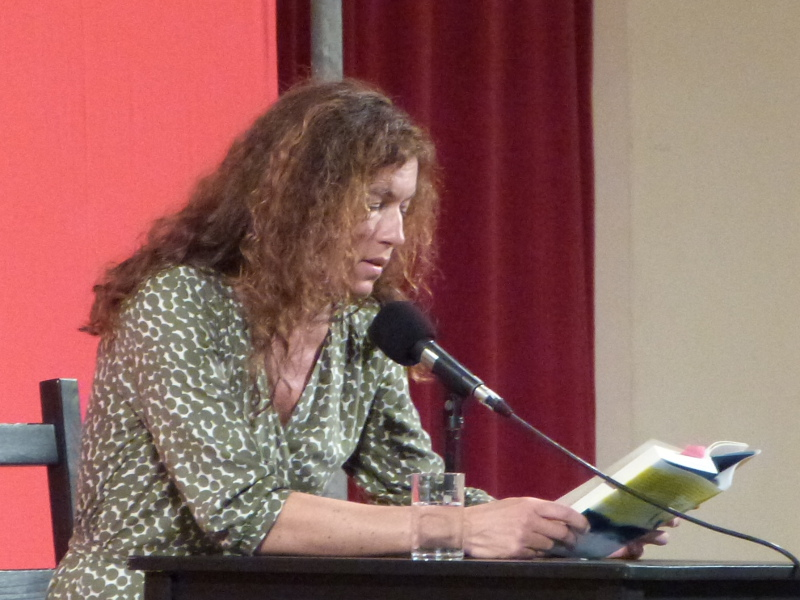
- Born: 13 November 1964 (age 61); Offenbach am Main, Germany
- Occupations: Writer; Translator
- Writing career
- Period: 21st century
- Notable awards: European Translation Award; 3Sat Award at the Festival of German-Language Literature; German Book Prize

Anne Weber (born 13 November 1964) is a German-French author, translator and self-translator.

== Biography ==
Since 1983, Anne Weber has lived in Paris. She studied in Paris and worked for several publishers. Anne Weber started writing and publishing in French, but immediately translated her first book, Ida invente la poudre, into German as Ida erfindet das Schießpulver. Since then she has written each of her books in French and German. Her self-translations are often published at the same time in France and Germany.

In 2005 she received the 3Sat award at the Festival of German-Language Literature. For her translation of Pierre Michon she received a European translation award, the Europäischer Übersetzerpreis Offenburg. She was awarded the 2020 German Book Prize. In 2021, Weber gave the “Schiller Speech” in the German Literature Archive in Marbach.

Her partner Antoine Jaccottet, a son of Philippe Jaccottet, works at the publishing house Le Bruit de Temps and was previously an editor at Gallimard.

== Works ==
Ida

- (France) French — Ida invente la poudre. Paris: Seuil, 1998
- (Germany) German — Ida erfindet das Schießpulver. Frankfurt am Main: Suhrkamp, 1999

In the beginning

- (Germany) German only — Im Anfang war. Frankfurt am Main: Suhrkamp, 2000

First person

- (France) French — Première personne. Paris: Seuil, 2001
- (Germany) German — Erste Person. Frankfurt am Main: Suhrkamp, 2002

Cerberus

- (France) French — Cerbère. Paris: Seuil, 2004
- (Germany) German — Besuch bei Zerberus. Frankfurt am Main: Suhrkamp, 2004

Two novellas

- (Germany) German — Gold im Mund. Frankfurt am Main: Suhrkamp, 2005
- (France) French — Cendres & Métaux. Paris: Seuil, 2006
- (France) French — Chers oiseaux. Paris: Seuil, 2006

The German volume contains the novellas Gold im Mund (Cendres & Métaux) and Liebe Vögel (Chers oiseaux), which were published separately in France.
All the best

- (France) French — Tous mes vœux. Arles: Actes Sud, 2010
- (Germany) German — Luft und Liebe. Frankfurt am Main: Fischer, 2010

Auguste

- (France) French — Auguste, tragédie bourgeoise pour marionnettes. Paris: Le Bruit du Temps, 2010
- (Germany) German — August, ein bürgerliches Puppentrauerspiel. Frankfurt am Main: Fischer, 2011

Valley of wonders

- (France) French — Vallée des merveilles. Paris: Seuil, 2012
- (Germany) German — Tal der Herrlichkeiten. Frankfurt am Main: Fischer, 2012

Fatherland

- (France) French — Vaterland. Paris: Seuil, 2015
- (Germany) German — Ahnen, ein Zeitreisetagebuch. Frankfurt am Main: Fischer, 2015

The French version does indeed have a German title.
Kirio

- (France) French — Kirio. Paris: Seuil, 2017
- (Germany) German — Kirio. Frankfurt am Main: Fischer, 2017

Annette

- (France) French — Annette, une épopée. Paris: Seuil, 2020
- (Germany) German — Annette, ein Heldinnenepos. Berlin: Matthes & Seitz, 2020

The life of Anne Beaumanoir in free verse. The German version won the German Book Prize for 2020.
Exclusion zones

- (Germany) German — Bannmeilen, ein Roman in Streifzügen. Berlin: Matthes & Seitz, 2024
- (France) French — Neuf-trois. Paris: Philippe Rey, 2025

The French title refers to the department number (93) of Seine-Saint-Denis on the outskirts of Paris.

== Translations into French ==
- Jacob Burckhardt: Démétrios, le preneur de villes. Paris 1992.
- Eleonore Frey: État d'urgence. Paris 1992.
- Wolfgang Schivelbusch: La nuit désenchantée. Paris 1993.
- Hans Mayer: Walter Benjamin. Paris 1995.
- Birgit Vanderbeke: Guerre froide. Paris 1997.
- Birgit Vanderbeke: Alberta reçoit un amant. Paris 1999.
- Jakob Arjouni: Un ami. Paris 2000.
- Corinne Hofmann: La Massaï blanche. Paris 2000.
- Melissa Müller: La vie d'Anne Frank. Paris 2000.
- Sibylle Lewitscharoff: Pong. Paris 2000.
- Birgit Vanderbeke: Devine ce que je vois. Paris 2000.
- Elke Schmitter: Madame Sartoris. Arles 2001.
- Lea Singer: Le maître du goût. Paris 2001.
- Wilhelm Genazino: Un parapluie pour ce jour-là. Paris 2002.
- Norbert Lebert: Car tu portes mon nom. Paris 2002.
- Sibylle Lewitscharoff: Harald le courtois. Paris 2002.
- Erich Maria Remarque: Dis-moi que tu m'aimes. Paris 2002.
- Wilhelm Genazino: Un appartement, une femme, un roman. Paris 2004.

== Translations into German ==
- Pierre Michon: Leben der kleinen Toten. Suhrkamp, 2003.
- Marguerite Duras: Hefte aus Kriegszeiten. Suhrkamp, 2007.
- Pierre Michon: Rimbaud der Sohn. Suhrkamp, 2008.
