= Béla Kamocsa =

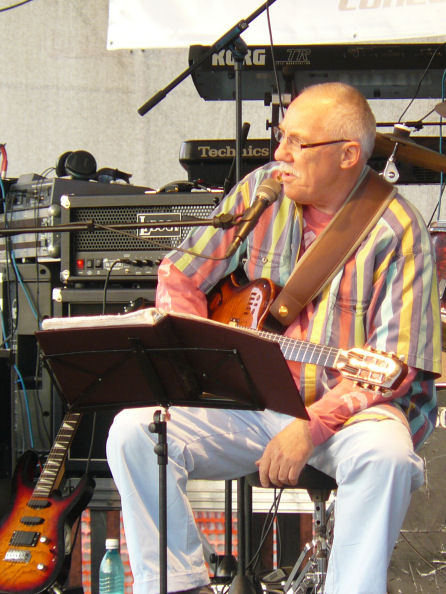
- Béla Kamocsa during a concert (June 2009, Timișoara)

Background information
- Born: 24 December 1944; Oradea, Romania
- Died: 14 January 2010 (aged 65) Timișoara, Romania
- Genres: Rock; Blues; Jazz
- Occupation(s): Musician, instrumentist, singer
- Instrument(s): Bass guitar, electric guitar
- Years active: 1962–2009
- Labels: Electrecord and others

Béla Kamocsa „Kamo" (born 24 December 1944, Oradea – died 14 January 2010, Timișoara) was a Romanian instrumentalist (bass guitar, electric guitar), musician and singer of Hungarian ethnicity. He interpreted rock, blues and jazz music. He is best known for being a founding member (1962) of Romanian band Phoenix, in which he was a member until 1971. In 1982, he establishes Bega Blues Band, one of the first Romanian bands dedicated to blues music. He spends the rest of his career as part of this band.

== Biography ==
His activity in jazz-rock band Gramophon (1972–1976, 1978–1981) and in the jazz trio Theophrastus (1981) is less known. He is the founder of the International Blues-Jazz Gala of Timișoara (1990) and of the Gărâna Jazz Festival.
