= Karl Dedecius =

German translator

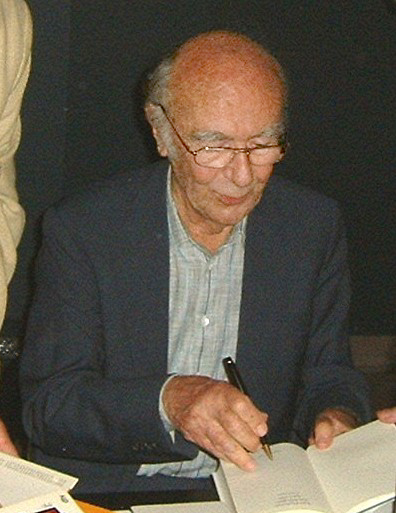
- Karl Dedecius in Frankfurt am Main, 2006
- Born: 20 May 1921; Łódź
- Died: 26 February 2016
- Occupations: Linguist, writer, translator, essayist, philologist, editor
- Awards: Friedenspreis des Deutschen Buchhandels (Heinrich Olschowsky, 1990)

Karl Dedecius (20 May 1921 in Łódź – 26 February 2016) - was a Polish-born German translator of Polish and Russian literature.

== Life ==
Dedecius was born to ethnic German parents in the city of Łódź, Poland, then a multicultural and multilingual city, which, though formerly ruled by the House of Romanov, at that time had only recently become a part of the newly founded Second Polish Republic. Dedecius attended the Polish Stefan-Żeromski High School, where he received his high-school degree (Matura). After the German invasion of Poland in the Second World War, Dedecius was first conscripted into the Reich Labor Service (Reichsarbeitsdienst) and then into the German Army. He was severely wounded in the Battle of Stalingrad and became a prisoner of war. During his time as a prisoner of war in the Gulag system of the Soviet Union, he taught himself Russian. Dedecius wrote, "I lay in my sick-bed, and the nurses brought me books by Lermontov, for instance. For one year, I learned the Cyrillic Alphabet and Russian by reading Lermontov and Pushkin. Eventually, the guards asked me to write love-letters for them, because I wrote like Pushkin."

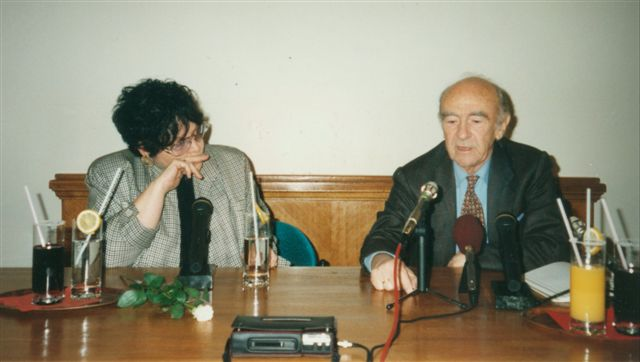
Dedecius in conversation with journalist Alina Perth-Grabowska, 1995

Dedecius was finally released from Soviet captivity in 1950. He settled first with his fiancé in Weimar, in East Germany. In 1952, he emigrated to West Germany and became an employee of the Allianz insurance company. In his free time, he occupied himself with Polish culture and with Polish literary translation, and maintained contact with anti-communist Polish dissident and émigré writers. Dedecius remarked ... "Only when I had gotten myself set up in life and enjoyed some stability was I able to turn to literature in a long-term and systematic way, although my career, you could say, had nothing whatever to do with writing." In the introduction to the Polish edition of "On Translating," Jerzy Kwiatkowski wrote: "Speaking formally, one could say that this translator’s great work came about on his evenings off, as a result of a hobby."

In 1959, he published his first anthology, Lektion der Stille (Lesson of Silence). In the following years, he translated, so to speak in his free time, such well-known Polish writers as Zbigniew Herbert, Stanisław Jerzy Lec, Czesław Miłosz, Tadeusz Różewicz and Wisława Szymborska. He also published essays on Polish literature and his own literary translation techniques.

In 1980, he initiated the German Poland Institute in Darmstadt. He served as the institute's director from 1980 through 1997. Meanwhile, continued his literary activities. Dedecius’ main achievements were the 50-volume "Polish Library" canon, which appeared between 1982 and 2000 from the Suhrkamp Verlag publishing house and the 7-volume "Panorama of Polish Literature of the 20th Century" (1996–2000), whose final volume presented a kind of Dedecius autobiography.

Dedecius died in Frankfurt, Germany on 26 February 2016 at the age of 94.

== Honors ==
Dedecius received many honorary doctorates, prizes and awards. In 1967, he was awarded the Johann-Heinrich-Voß-Preis für Übersetzung. In 1990, he received the Friedenspreis des Deutschen Buchhandels, in 1997 the Samuel-Bogumil-Linde-Preis. Since 2004, the Robert Bosch Stiftung, in cooperation with the German Poland institute, awards the Karl-Dedecius-Preis for translators, which is endowed with a prize of €10,000.

== Works ==
- 1971: Deutsche und Polen. Botschaft der Bücher. [Germans and Poles: The Diplomacy of Books] München: Hanser. ISBN 3-446-11481-5.
- 1974 "Überall ist Polen" [Poland is Everywhere], Frankfurt a.M.: Suhrkamp. ISBN 3-518-36695-5
- 1975: Polnische Profile [Polish Profiles]. Frankfurt a.M.: Suhrkamp. ISBN 3-518-02570-8.
- 1981: Zur Literatur und Kultur Polens [On the Literature and Culture of Poland] Frankfurt a.M.: Suhrkamp. ISBN 3-518-02571-6
- 1981: Polnische Pointen Satiren und kleine Prosa des 20.Jahrhunderts Karl Dedecius. Ullstein Buch
- 1986: Vom Übersetzen. Theorie und Praxis [On Translating: Theory and Practice] Frankfurt a.M.: Suhrkamp. ISBN 3-518-37758-2.
- 1988: Von Polens Poeten [On Poland's Poets] Frankfurt a.M.: Suhrkamp. ISBN 3-518-37979-8.
- 1990: Lebenslauf aus Büchern und Blättern [A Curriculum Vitae Made of Books and Pages] Frankfurt a.M.: Suhrkamp. ISBN 3-518-40309-5.
- 1996: Ost West Basar. Ansprachen Essays Würdigungen. [East-West Bazaar: Addresses, Essays and Appreciations] With a foreword by Marion Gräfin Dönhoff. Selected and with an Afterword by Andreas Lawaty. Zürich: Ammann-Verlag. ISBN 3-250-10283-0
- 2000: Panorama der polnischen Literatur des 20. Jahrhunderts. Abt.V. Panorama. Ein Rundblick [Panorama of Polish Literature of the 20th Century: Section V. Panorama.] Zürich: Ammann-Verlag. ISBN 3-250-50005-4.
- 2002: Die Kunst der Übersetzung [The Art of Translating] Berlin: Logos Verlag. ISBN 3-8325-0000-6.
- 2006: Ein Europäer aus Lodz : Erinnerungen [A European from Lodz: Memoirs] Frankfurt am Main: Suhrkamp, ISBN 3-518-41756-8

== Literature ==
- Elvira Grözinger, Andreas Lawaty (Eds.): Suche die Meinung: Karl Dedecius, dem Übersetzer und Mittler zum 65. Geburtstag [Searching for the Opinion: Festschrift for the Translator and Intermediary Karl Dedecius on his 65th Birthday] Wiesbaden 1986, Otto Harrassowitz. ISBN 3-447-02630-8.
- Manfred Mack (Ed.): "Karl Dedecius und das Deutsche Polen-Institut. Laudationes, Berichte, Interviews, Gedichte" [Karl Dedecius and the German Poland Institute. Laidatios, Reports, Interviews, Poems]. Darmstadt 1991, Justus von Liebig Verlag, ISBN 3-87390-098-X.
- Hubert Orłowski: Karl Dedecius, in Marek Zybura (Ed.): ...nie będzie nigdy Niemiec Polakowi bratem...? Wrocław: Okis. pp. 268–279. ISBN 83-904842-0-X.
