= Ernest Wichner =

German writer, editor and literary translator

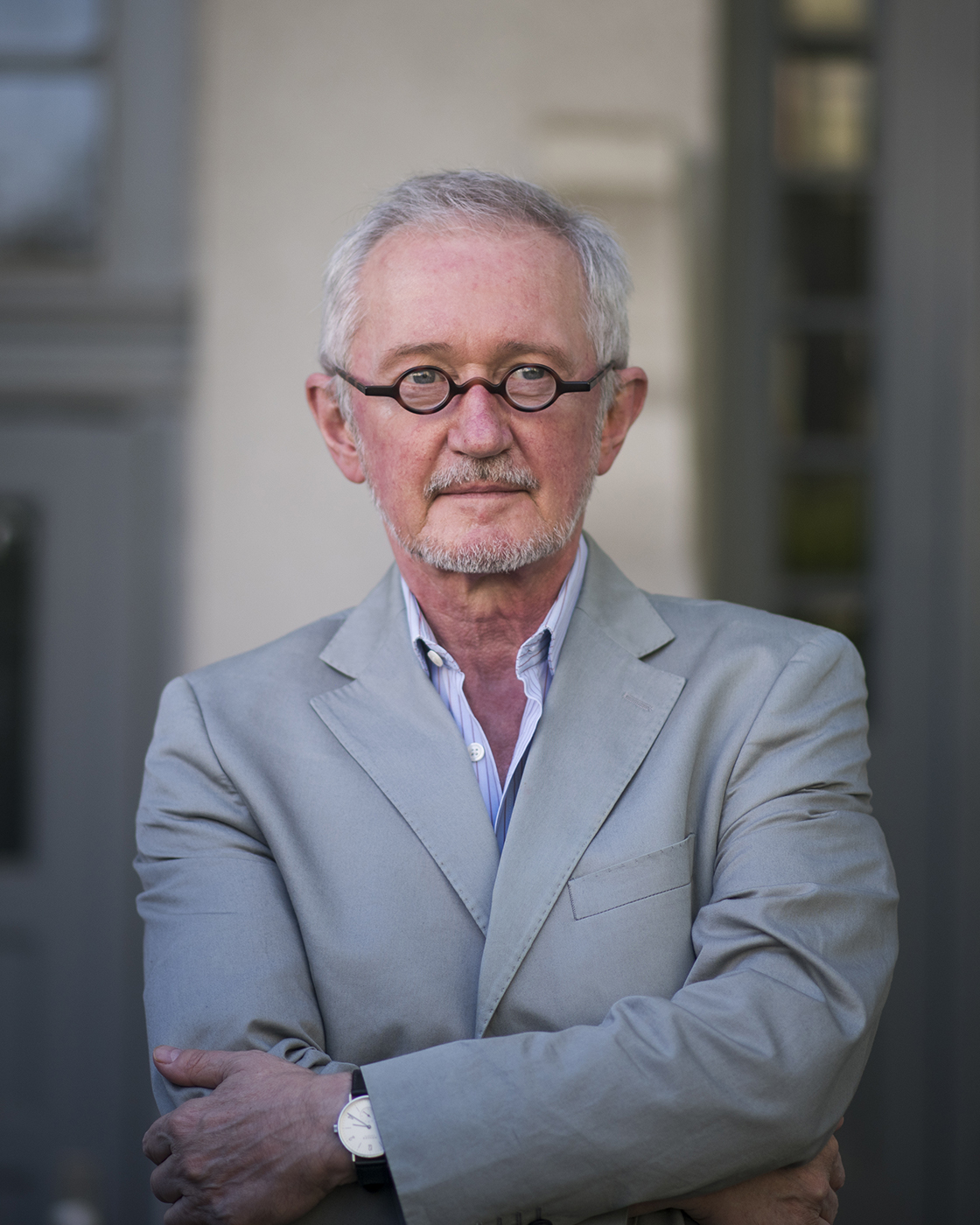
Ernest Wichner in 2018

Ernest Wichner (born in Zăbrani, 17 April 1952) is a German writer, editor, and literary translator of Banat Swabian origin.

== Translations ==
- Norman Manea: Der Trenchcoat. Erzählung. Steidl Verlag, Göttingen 1990
- Max Blecher: Aus der unmittelbaren Unwirklichkeit. Prosa, übersetzt und mit einem Nachwort versehen von Ernest Wichner, Edition Plasma, Berlin 1990 (Neuausgabe mit Nachwort von Herta Müller, Bibliothek Suhrkamp, Frankfurt a.M. 2003)
- Carmen-Francesca Banciu: Fenster in Flammen. Erzählungen, übersetzt von Ernest Wichner und Rolf Bossert, Rotbuch Verlag, Berlin 1992
- Ștefan Bănulescu: Ein Schneesturm aus anderer Zeit. Erzählungen, übersetzt von Ernest Wichner und Oskar Pastior, Nachwort von Ernest Wichner, Suhrkamp Verlag, Frankfurt a.M. 1994
- Dumitru Țepeneag: Hotel Europa. Roman, Alexander Fest Verlag, Berlin 1998 (Taschenbuch Suhrkamp, Verlag Frankfurt a.M. 2000)
- Daniel Bănulescu: Schrumpeln wirst du wirst eine exotische Frucht sein. Gedichte (rum./dt.), aus dem Rumänischen und mit einem Nachwort von Ernest Wichner, edition per procura, Wien/Lana 2003
- Nora Iuga: Der Autobus mit den Buckligen. Gedichte, aus dem Rumänischen von Ernest Wichner, Edition Solitude, Stuttgart 2003
- M. Blecher: Vernarbte Herzen. Roman, übersetzt und mit einem Nachwort von Ernest Wichner, Bibliothek Suhrkamp, Frankfurt a.M., 2006
- Cristian Popescu: Familie Popescu, Prosa (rum./dt.), aus dem Rumänischen von Ernest Wichner, edition per procura, Wien/Lana 2006
- Nora Iuga: Gefährliche Launen. Ausgewählte Gedichte, aus dem Rumänischen von Ernest Wichner, mit einem Nachwort von Mircea Cǎrtǎrescu, Verlag Klett-Cotta, Stuttgart 2007
- M. Blecher: Beleuchtete Höhle. Sanatoriumstagebuch, übersetzt und mit einem Nachwort von Ernest Wichner, Bibliothek Suhrkamp, Frankfurt a.M. 2008
- Ion Mureșan: Acces interzis!/Zugang verboten! Gedichte (rum./dt.), ausgewählt, mit einem Nachwort und übersetzt von Ernest Wichner, büroabrasch, Wien 2008
- Mircea Cărtărescu: Warum wir die Frauen lieben. Geschichten, aus dem Rumänischen von Ernest Wichner, Suhrkamp, Frankfurt a.M. 2008
- Daniel Bănulescu: Was schön ist und dem Daniel gefällt. Gedichte, übersetzt und mit einem Nachwort versehen von Ernest Wichner; merz&solitude, Stuttgart 2009
- Christopher Middleton: Im geheimen Haus. Gedichte englisch-deutsch, übersetzt von Ernest Wichner, Verlag Das Wunderhorn, Heidelberg 2009
- Mircea Cărtărescu: Travestie, Suhrkamp Verlag, Berlin 2010 ISBN 978-3-518-42179-6

== Awards ==
- 1987 Förderpreis zum Marburger Literaturpreis
- 1990 Stipendium Künstlerhaus Edenkoben
- 1991 Förderpreis zum Andreas-Gryphius-Preis
- 1997 Lyrik-Stipendium Niedersachsen
- 2005 Preis der Stadt Münster für Europäische Poesie (with Daniel Banulescu)
- 2020 Johann Heinrich Voß Prize in Translation
