= Staffan Seeberg =

Swedish writer and physician

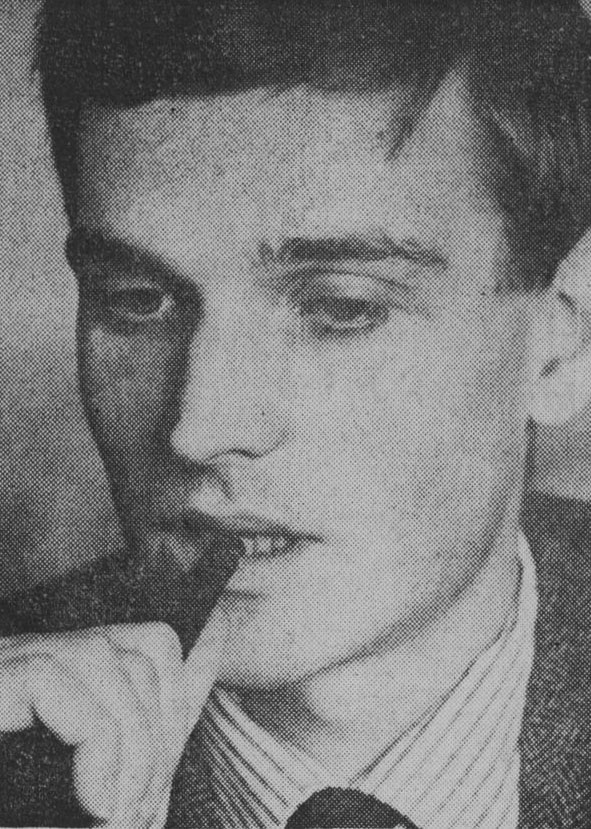
Staffan Seeberg, 1938-, swedish author

Karl Oskar "Staffan" Seeberg (Stockholm, 4 August 1938) is a Swedish writer and physician. He currently lives in Båstad.

His first novel P:s lidanden was published in 1966, and his breakthrough came in 1970 with Vägen genom Vasaparken.

He got his PhD in medicine in 1975. His works are very critical of the society.

== Works ==
- 1966 – P:s lidanden
- 1967 – Grodorna
- 1968 – Fem berättelser
- 1970 – Vägen genom Vasaparken
- 1971 – Lungfisken
- 1975 – Cancerkandidaterna
- 1977 – Holobukk
- 1980 – Grönlandsskogen
- 1982 – Där havet börjar
- 1985 – Stellas frihet
- 1990 – Därför
- 1995 – Aprilfloden
- 1997 – Lauras ansikte
- 2000 – Ariadnes spår
- 2005 – Sjöjungfruns namn

== Awards ==
- 1966 – Eckersteinska literature prize
- 1970 – Aftonbladet literature prize
