= Nicu Covaci =

Nicolae Covaci
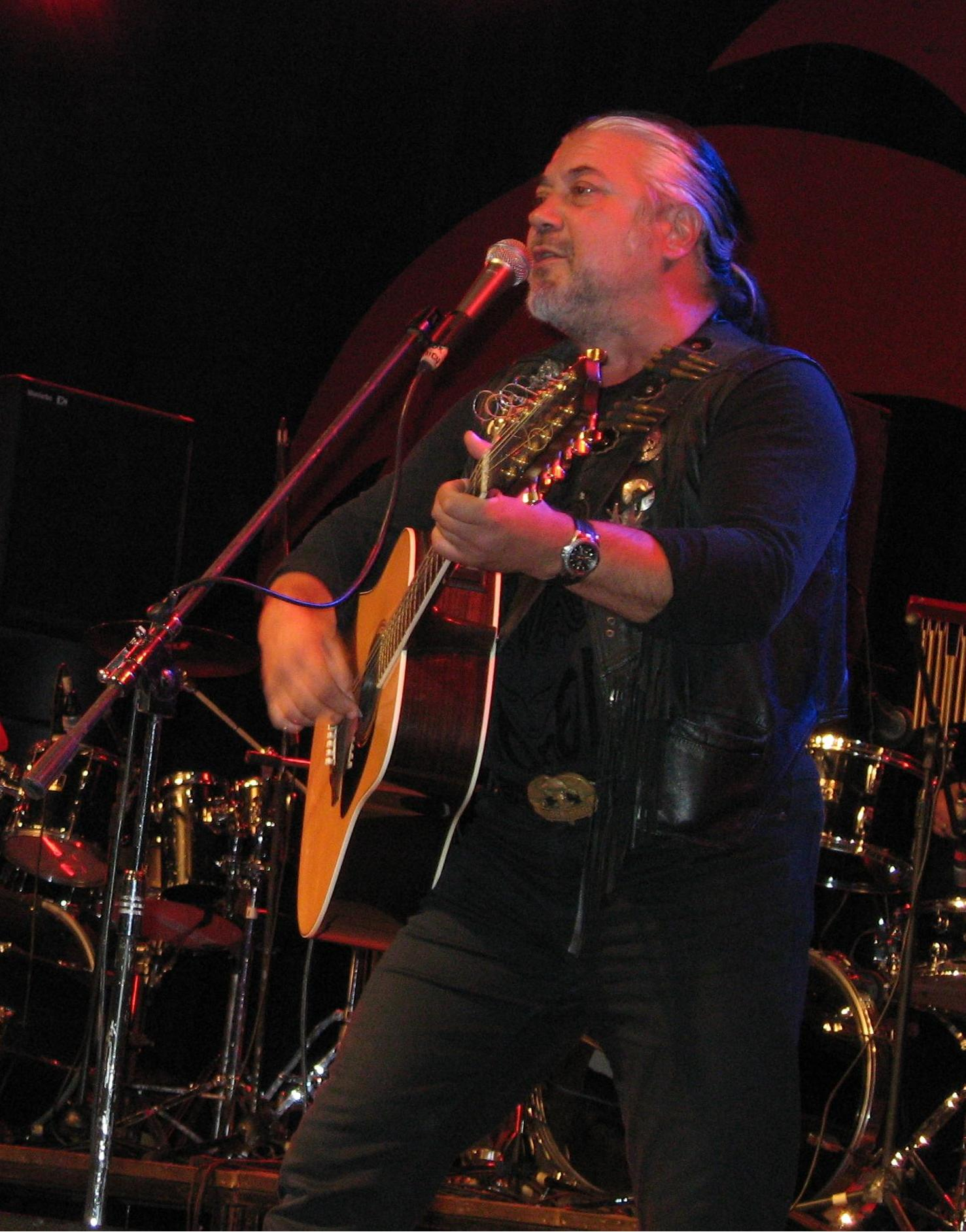
- Covaci performing live with Phoenix in 2006

Background information
- Born: Nicolae Covaci; 19 April 1947; Timișoara, Kingdom of Romania
- Died: 2 August 2024 (aged 77) Timișoara, Romania
- Genres: Progressive rock, ethnic rock, psychedelic rock, heavy metal, hard rock, folk rock, folk metal
- Occupations: Musician, painter
- Instruments: Guitar, vocals
- Years active: 1960–2024
- Formerly of: Phoenix
- Website: www.covaci.de

Nicolae "Nicu" Covaci (19 April 1947 – 2 August 2024) was a Romanian guitarist, painter, and music composer. He is best known as the leader and founding member of rock and cult band Phoenix, for which he was the lead vocalist and guitar player, with more than 60 years of activity.

== Biography ==
Nicolae Covaci was born in Timișoara, on 19 April 1947. His mother Tamara came originally from Bessarabia while his father Grigore came from Banat, close to the Serbian border. He took up playing guitar at the age of 15 and in 1962 he, together with Florin "Moni" Bordeianu, founded a band called Sfinții (The Saints). Covaci died in Timișoara on 2 August 2024, at the age of 77.

== 1960s ==
- 1962: Nicolae Covaci founds the student band "Sfinții" (The Saints) in Timișoara. The band wins the second prize at the Bucharest Student Festival. From the very beginning the band is criticized for having a western European influence.
- 1963: The band's recordings of their own compositions first receive radio air play.
- 1965: The Saints are banned. The authorities accuse the band of spreading religious propaganda, and the band is forced to change its name. PHOENIX is born. Under their new name, the band plays three times a week at the School of Engineering cantina, and later at "Lola", the club of the Construction Industry Union in Timișoara.
- 1968: PHOENIX wins the Grand-Prix of the Romanian Festival in Iași. The band receives its first recording contract and makes regular appearances on radio and TV. PHOENIX releases its first record "Vremuri" (Times), an EP with four songs.
- 1969: The band wins prizes for creativity and interpretation at the Romanian student festival at the School of Architecture in Bucharest. Their second four-song EP called "Floarea stîncilor" (The flower of the rocks) is released.

== 1970s ==
- 1970: PHOENIX again wins a prize (for originality) at the Romanian student festival at the School of Architecture in Bucharest.
- 1971: The band changes its style and finds its own direction, inspired by pre-Christian rites and customs of the Balkans. Their third EP "Mesterul Manole" is released with three songs. PHOENIX is invited to play at the "Bratislava Lyra" and "Sopot" festivals in Czechoslovakia and Poland-the band is a big hit.
- 1972: Cei ce ne-au dat nume (The Ones Who Gave us the Name), the band's first LP is released. After the release of the second LP with the metaphoric title Mugur de fluier (Flute bud) the authorities ban PHOENIX from appearing in Romania.
- 1973: Cantafabule is released. It is their first double LP and a milestone in Romanian music history.
- 1974: PHOENIX plays concerts with the ensemble "The Drummers from Brănești", a group of 25 men from a small village in the Carpathians, who play traditional rhythms on different drums.
- Leaving 1976: Nicu Covaci renounces his Romanian citizenship and leaves Romania for Amsterdam. He founds a new band with musicians of different nationalities.
- 1977: Covaci returns to Romania and helps the members of his band escape. They hide in the band's Marshall speakers and are smuggled across four borders to Germany.

== 1980s – The New Phoenix ==
- 1978: The band breaks up. The band members leave Covaci and try to make it on their own under the name "Madhouse".
- 1981: PHOENIX releases its first production in English, the LP Transsylvania Phoenix. The band disintegrates again.
- 1983: Nicu Covaci plays with Dzidek Marcinkiewicz as a duo.
- 1986: Nicu Covaci and Erlend Krauser contribute to the production of Evita in Osnabrück.
- 1987: "The Lark" + "Ballade for You". Nicu Covaci contributes to the production of Jesus Christ Superstar in Osnabrück.
- 1988: Release of the single "Tuareg" + "Mr. G's promises".

== 1990s – Covaci returns to Romania ==
- 1990: PHOENIX launches a gigantic come-back in Romania. The band raffles off 5,000 singles of "Ciocârlia".

=== Tours in Romania ===
- 1992: Nicolae Covaci produces the CD Symphoenix with the Romanian choir "Song" and the Radio Bucharest Symphonic Orchestra.
- 1993: The CD version of Cantafabule is released.
- 1994–1997: Various tours in Romania.
- 1997: The CD Aniversare 35 (35th Anniversary) is released. Vremuri – Anii 60 is released on CD.
- 1998: PHOENIX is going on big Romania-Tour with the mammoth-show Cantafabule.
- 1999: Cei ce ne-au dat nume and Mugur de fluier are released on CD.

PHOENIX releases a new 3 song maxi-CD with Numai Una, Iovano, and Ora-Hora and performs November concerts in Germany at "Works" and "Erdbeerblau" in Osnabrück, and in the "Osterfeldhalle" in Esslingen.

== 2000s ==
- 2000: Spring tour in Romania. For the first time in history, a free CD is given with each ticket purchased. 35,000 maxi-CDs are given as gifts.
- 2000: The CD In the Shadow of the Big Bear is released. It expresses Nicu Covaci's disappointment with the situation in Romania.
- 2000: December Germany Tour: In the Shadow of the Big Bear.
- 2001: The CD In the Shadow of the Big Bear sung in English by Malcolm J. Lewis is released.
- 2005: A new album, called Baba Novak is released. The guitarist Cristi Gram joins the band in 2004. The release of the album is followed by a tour of the band in many cities of Romania.
- 2007: Following conflicts between Nicu Covaci and Mircea Baniciu, the vocalist of the band, the latter leaves Phoenix. Soon, the bassist, Joszef "Ioji" Kappl, and the violinist, Mani Neumann, leave the band, too. While Mani continues his musical activity with his band "Farfarello", in Germany, Mircea Baniciu hooks up with Ioji Kappl and they form a new folk duo.

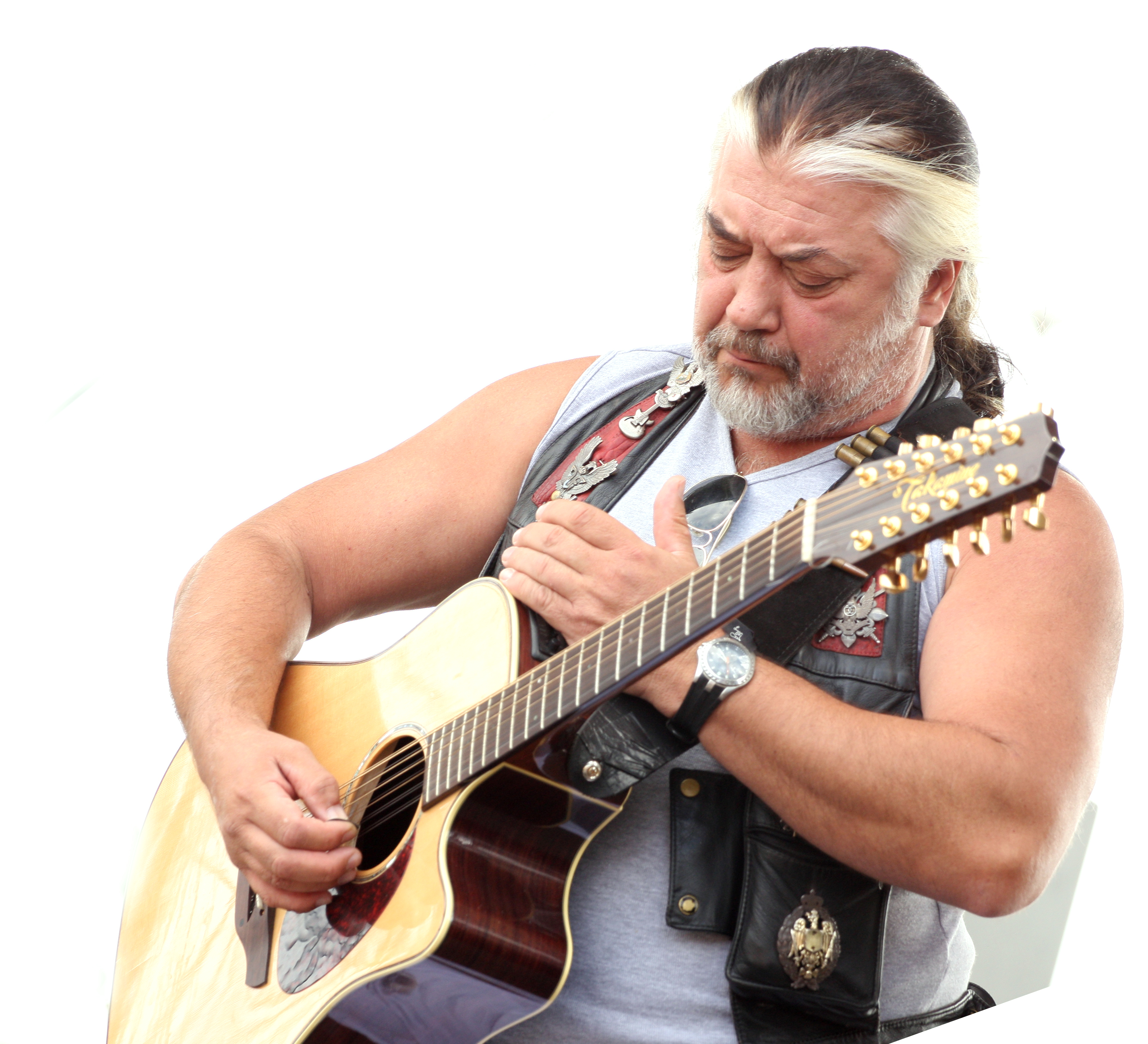
Covaci in concert at Târgu Mureș, 2010

- In 2008, Nicu Covaci re-built the band, and the new members include, beside Covaci, Florin "Moni" Bordeianu (the first vocalist of the band), Bogdan Bradu (vocals), Dzidek Marcinkiewicz (keyboards), Volker Vaessen (bass), Ovidiu "Țăndărică" Lipan (drums), and Cristi Gram (guitar). The album Back to the Future is recorded, including some songs composed by Moni Bordeianu during the time he was in the USA.
- 2010: The band carries out a new musical project, called Sym Phoenix, with the Bucharest Symphony Orchestra. The show had its premiere on 28 April 2010 in Bucharest.
- 2015: He performed in Bucharest's Winter Night II, at which he played Fata Verde together with the Italian band Tothem.
- 2023: Playing at the concert held by Mircea Baniciu & Band on the evening of 13 October 2023 at Porto Arte, Timișoara.

Covaci died on 2 August 2024 and was buried in the Heroes Cemetery in Timișoara.
