= 2009 Nobel Prize in Literature =

- Herta Müller
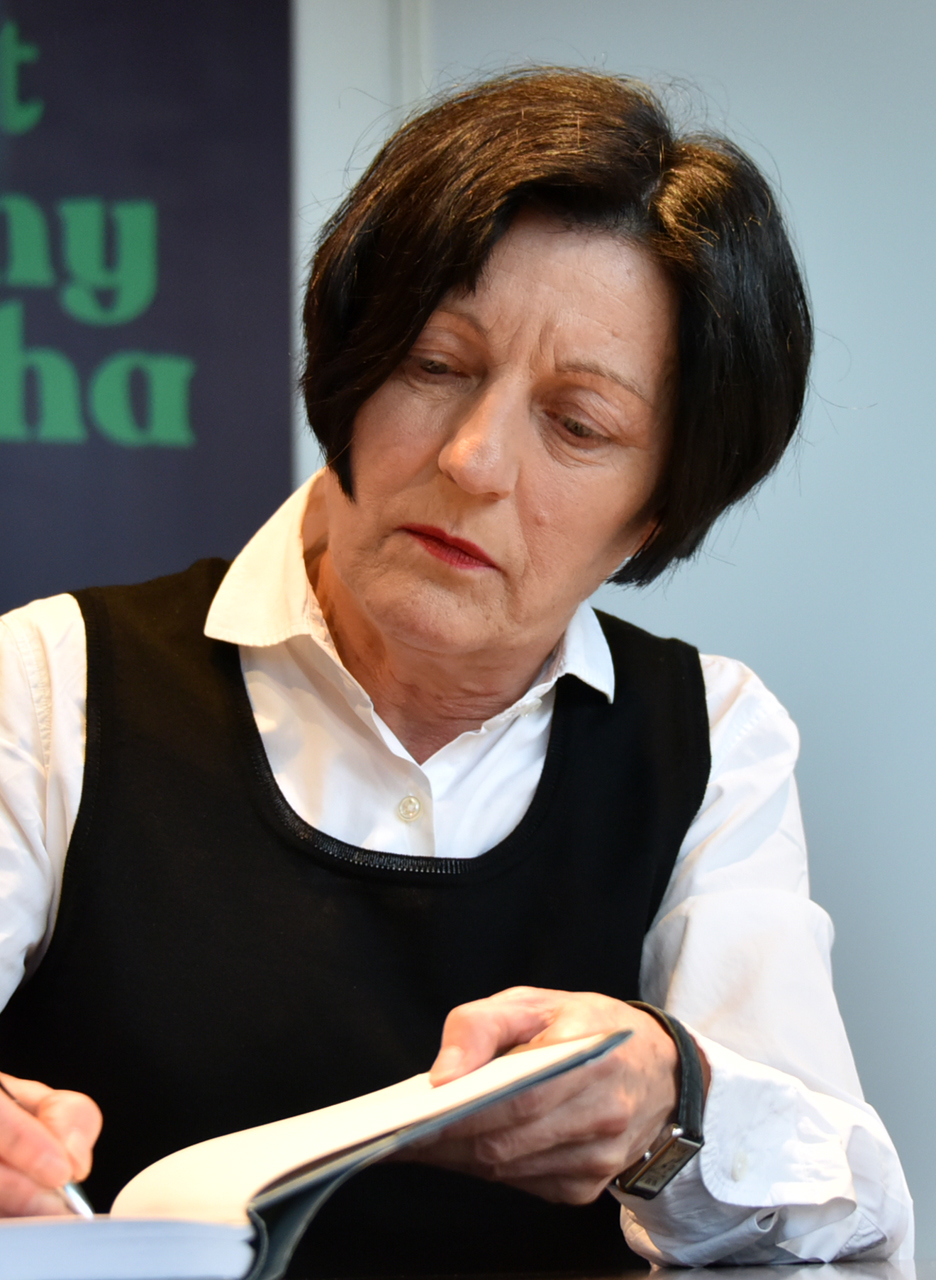
- "who, with the concentration of poetry and the frankness of prose, depicts the landscape of the dispossessed."
- Date: 8 October 2009 (announcement); 10 December 2009 (ceremony)
- Location: Stockholm, Sweden
- Presented by: Swedish Academy
- First award: 1901
- Website: Official website

The 2009 Nobel Prize in Literature was awarded to the Romanian-German author Herta Müller (born 1953) "who, with the concentration of poetry and the frankness of prose, depicts the landscape of the dispossessed." She is the ninth German-language writer to become a recipient of the prize after Günter Grass in 1999.

== Laureate ==
Herta Müller's literary works address an individual's vulnerability under oppression and persecution as in Drückender Tango ("Oppressive Tango", 1984) and Der Teufel sitzt im Spiegel ("The Devil is Sitting in the Mirror", 1991). Her works are rooted in her experiences as one of Romania's German-speaking ethnic minority and describes life under Ceaușescu's regime—how dictatorship breeds a fear and alienation that stays in an individual's mind. Innovatively and with linguistic precision, she evokes images from the past as in Heute wär ich mir lieber nicht begegnet ("The Appointment", 1997). Müller's literary works are largely prosaic, although she also writes poetry. Among her famous literary works include Barfüßiger Februar ("Barefoot February", 1987), Der Fuchs war damals schon der Jäger ("The Fox Was Ever the Hunter", 1992), Herztier ("The Land of Green Plums", 1994), and Atemschaukel ("The Hunger Angel", 2009).

== Candidates ==
On Ladbrokes, Israeli novelist Amos Oz was the favourite to win the 2009 Nobel Prize in Literature. Other favourites included Algerian Assia Djebar, Spanish Juan Goytisolo, Americans Philip Roth and Joyce Carol Oates, Italians Claudio Magris and Antonio Tabucchi, Syrian Adonis, and Japanese Haruki Murakami.

== Reactions and award ceremony ==
Müller's nail scissors, which she used to cut words from printed materials, hanging in the Nobel Prize Museum.

Awarding Herta Müller, previously little-known outside Germany but many times named favorite for the Nobel Prize, re-ignited the viewpoint that the Swedish Academy was biased and Eurocentric. The academy compared Müller's style and her use of German as a minority language with Franz Kafka and pointed out the influence of Kafka on Müller. The award coincided with the 20th anniversary of the fall of communism. Michael Krüger, head of Müller's publishing house, said: "By giving the award to Herta Müller, who grew up in a German-speaking minority in Romania, the committee has recognized an author who refuses to let the inhumane side of life under communism be forgotten"

Professor Anders Olsson, during the award ceremony on December 10, 2009, further explained why Müller deserves to be awarded, by saying:

"Some literature reveals its deep qualities slowly, step by step. Other literature captures the reader immediately by its resolute address. Herta Müller’s work belongs in the latter category. Her prose has a linguistic energy that we bond with from the first sentence. Something concerning life or death is at stake. We sense this quickly through the temperature, the hurried breathing, the sharp detail, and everything implied but left unsaid."

== Nobel lecture ==
Müller delivered a Nobel lecture on December 7, 2009 at the Swedish Academy entitled "Every word knows something of a vicious circle", which describes how living under a dictatorship shapes her work. She outlines how words and writing allowed her to turn humiliation into a type of dignity that takes time to arouse suspicion.

== Gallery ==
- 8 October 2009: Announcement of the 2009 Nobel Prize laureate in Literature by Permanent secretary Peter Englund.

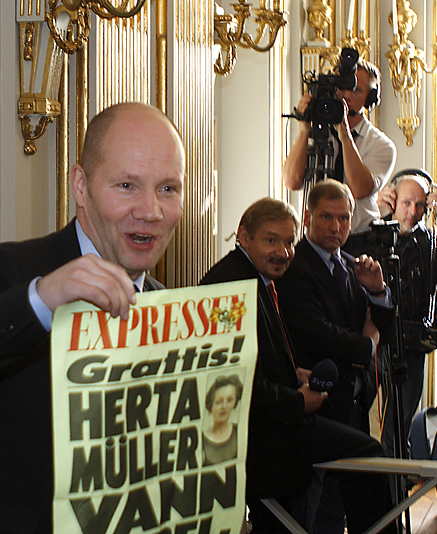
