= Guttenbrunn =

Guttenbrunn may refer to:

- Guttenbrunn, the German name for Zăbrani, a commune in Arad County, Romania

== People with the surname Guttenbrunn ==
- Adam Müller-Guttenbrunn, Austrian author
- Ludwig Guttenbrunn, Austrian painter

== See also ==
- Gutenbrunn, municipality in Austria
