= Aktionsgruppe Banat =

German literary society

The Aktionsgruppe Banat was a literary society that fought for freedom of speech, founded by German-speaking authors of the Banat Swabian minority in the Romanian Banat in 1972. The society suffered persecution from the communist authorities and the Securitate secret police, and was eventually dissolved by the communist authorities in 1975.

== Members ==
The society included the following members.

- Albert Bohn
- Rolf Bossert
- Werner Kremm
- Johann Lippet
- Gerhard Ortinau
- Anton Sterbling
- William Totok
- Richard Wagner
- Ernest Wichner

Herta Müller, Horst Samson, Roland Kirsch, Helmuth Frauendorfer, and Werner Söllner, who are often mentioned in connection with the society, were not members of the society that existed from 1972 to 1975, but were active in the "Adam Müller-Guttenbrunn" literary circle, which comprised most of the membership of Aktionsgruppe Banat.

== Documentary movie ==
In 2010, the premiere of the documentary "An den Rand geschrieben – German writers, originating from Romania, in the spotlight of the Securitate", conducted by Helmuth Frauendorfer and Michael Baum, took place in Berlin. The film addresses the topic of the security investigation of the German writers from Banat and the evolution, in the context of the German literature in western Romania of the 70th and 80th, with the emphasis on their courage to rebelling and the experiences of the Banat Action Group founders under the Communist regime.

== Literature ==
- William Totok (1988). Die Zwänge der Erinnerung. Aufzeichnungen aus Rumänien. Hamburg.
- Ernest Wichner, ed. (1992). Ein Pronomen ist verhaftet worden. Die frühen Jahre in Rumänien. Texte der Aktionsgruppe Banat. Frankfurt am Main.
- Anton Sterbling (2008). Am Anfang war das Gespräch”. Reflexionen und Beiträge zur "Aktionsgruppe Banat" und andere literatur- und kunstbezogene Arbeiten. Hamburg.
- Sabina Kienlechner (November 2010), ""Unter dem Einfluss der bürgerlichen Ideologie". Die "Aktionsgruppe Banat" in den Akten der Securitate", Sinn und Form, vol. 62, no. 6, pp. 746–769
- Adela-Gabriela Hîncu: Children of the Cultural Revolution „Gone Astray”: The Forlorn 1970s Generation of German Writers from Socialist Romania, Budapest, 2013, in: Academia.edu
