= Herta Müller =

German writer and Nobel Prize recipient (born 1953)

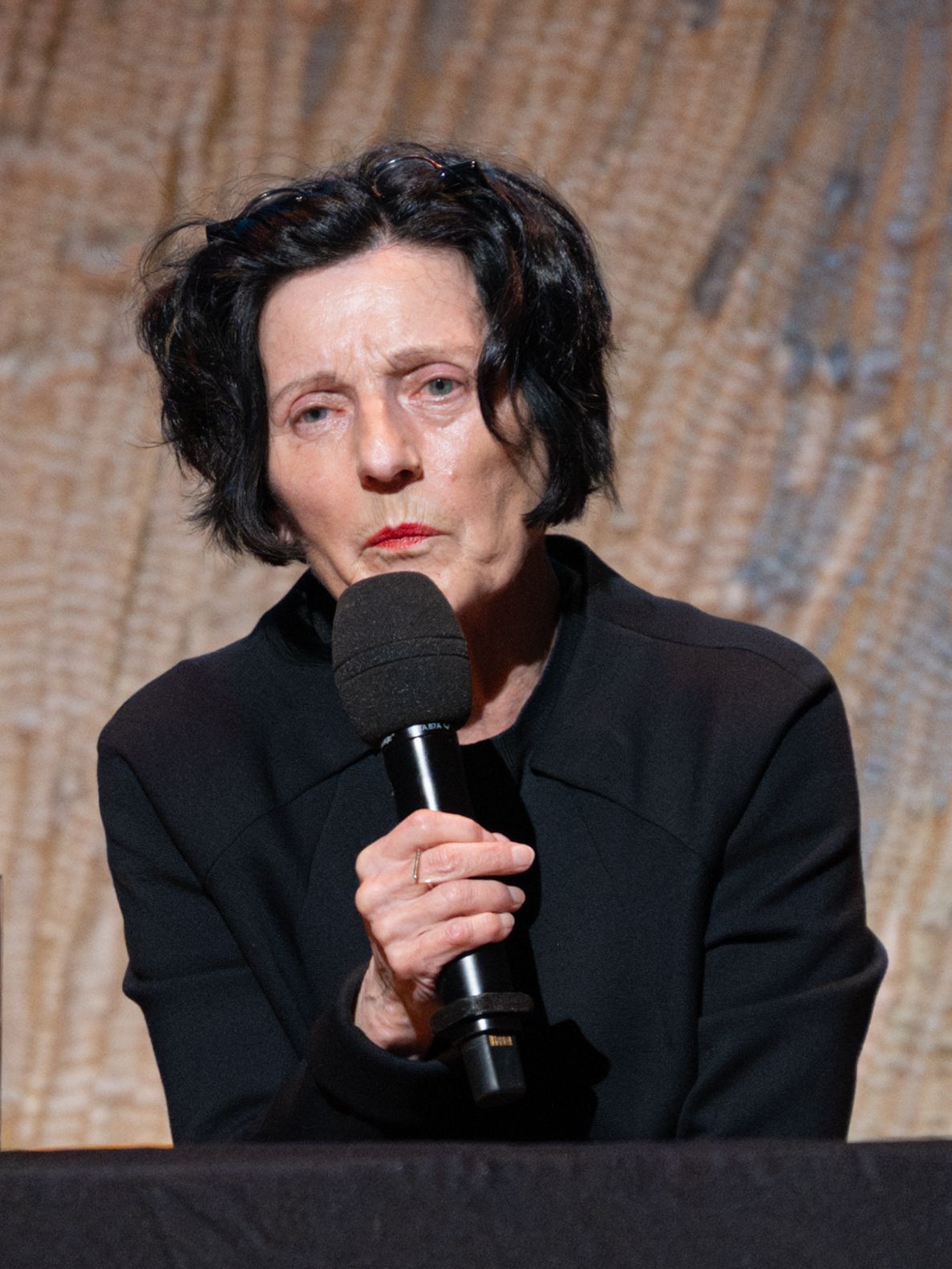
- Müller in 2025
- Born: 17 August 1953 (age 73); Nițchidorf, Timiș County, SR Romania
- Education: West University of Timișoara
- Occupations: Novelist, poet
- Writing career
- Period: 1982–present
- Notable works: Nadirs; The Passport; The Land of Green Plums; The Appointment; The Hunger Angel
- Notable awards: Kleist Prize (1994); International Dublin Literary Award (1998); Franz Werfel Human Rights Award (2009); Nobel Prize in Literature (2009)

Signature
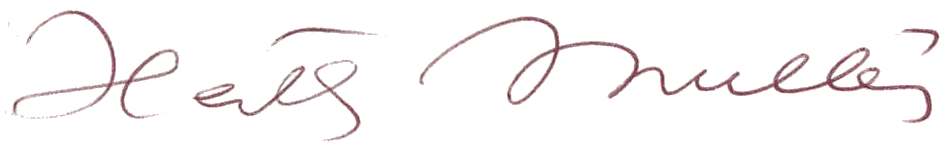

Herta Müller (German: [ˈhɛʁta ˈmʏlɐ]; born 17 August 1953) is a Romanian-German novelist, poet, essayist and recipient of the 2009 Nobel Prize in Literature. She was born in Nițchidorf, Timiș County in Romania; her native languages are German and Romanian. Since the early 1990s, she has been internationally established, and her works have been translated into more than twenty languages.

Müller is noted for her works depicting the effects of violence, cruelty and terror, usually in the setting of the Socialist Republic of Romania under the repressive Nicolae Ceaușescu regime which she has experienced herself. Many of her works are told from the viewpoint of the German minority in Romania and are also a depiction of the modern history of the Germans in the Banat and Transylvania. Her much acclaimed 2009 novel The Hunger Angel (Atemschaukel) portrays the deportation of Romania's German minority to Soviet Gulags during the Soviet occupation of Romania for use as German forced labour.

Müller has received more than twenty awards to date, including the Kleist Prize (1994), the Aristeion Prize (1995), the International Dublin Literary Award (1998) and the Franz Werfel Human Rights Award (2009). On 8 October 2009, the Swedish Academy announced that she had been awarded the Nobel Prize in Literature, describing her as a woman "who, with the concentration of poetry and the frankness of prose, depicts the landscape of the dispossessed".

== Early life ==
Müller was born to Banat Swabian Catholic farmers in Nițchidorf (German: Nitzkydorf; Hungarian: Niczkyfalva), up to the 1980s a German-speaking village in the Romanian Banat in southwestern Romania. Her grandfather had been a wealthy farmer and merchant, but his property was confiscated by the Communist regime. Her father was a member of the Waffen-SS during World War II, and earned a living as a truck driver in Communist Romania. In 1945, her mother, born 1928 as Katarina Gion, then aged 17, was among 100,000 of the German minority deported to forced labour camps in the Soviet Union, from which she was released in 1950. Müller's native language is German; she learned Romanian only in grammar school. She graduated from Nikolaus Lenau High School before becoming a student of German studies and Romanian literature at West University of Timișoara.

In 1976, Müller began working as a translator for an engineering factory, but was dismissed in 1979 for her refusal to cooperate with the Securitate, the Communist regime's secret police. After her dismissal, she initially earned a living by teaching in kindergarten and giving private German lessons.

== Career ==
Müller's first book, Niederungen (Nadirs), was published in Romania in German in 1982, receiving a prize from the Central Committee of the Union of Communist Youth. The book was about a child's view of the German-cultural Banat. Some members of the Banat Swabian community criticized Müller for "fouling her own nest" by her unsympathetic portrayal of village life. Müller was a member of Aktionsgruppe Banat, a group of German-speaking writers in Romania who supported freedom of speech over the censorship they faced under Nicolae Ceaușescu's government, and her works, including The Land of Green Plums, deal with these issues. Radu Tinu, the Securitate officer in charge of her case, denies that she ever suffered any persecutions, a claim that is opposed by Müller's own version of her (ongoing) persecution in an article in the German weekly Die Zeit in July 2009.

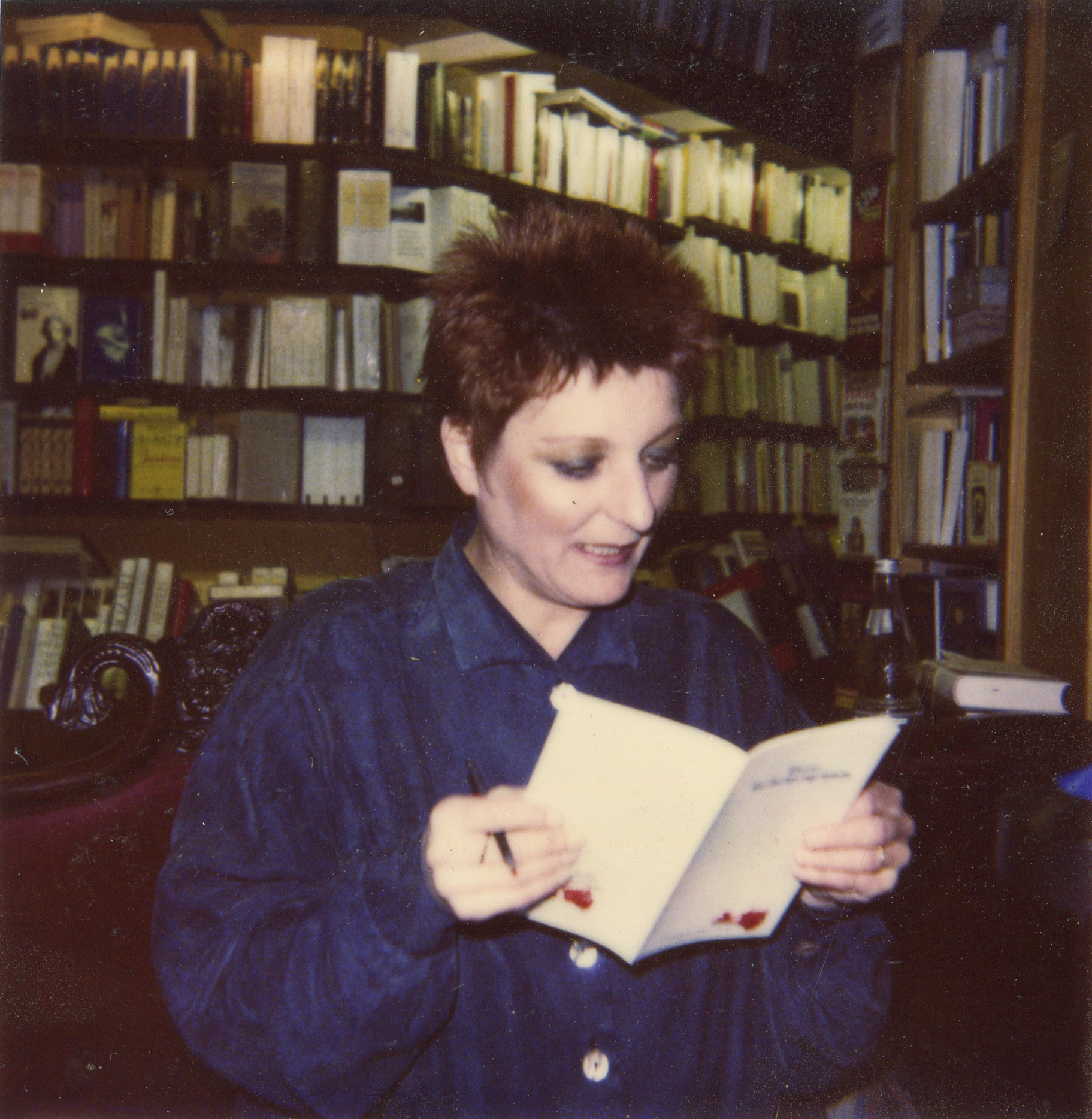
Müller in Hanover, 1992

After being refused permission to emigrate to West Germany in 1985, Müller was finally allowed to leave along with her then-husband, novelist Richard Wagner, in 1987, and they settled in West Berlin, where both still live. In the following years, she accepted lectureships at universities in Germany and abroad. Müller was elected to membership in the Deutsche Akademie für Sprache und Dichtung in 1995, and other honorary positions followed. In 1997, she withdrew from the PEN centre of Germany in protest of its merger with the former German Democratic Republic branch. In July 2008, Müller sent a critical open letter to Horia-Roman Patapievici, president of the Romanian Cultural Institute in reaction to the moral and financial support given by the institute to two former informants of the Securitate participating at the Romanian-German Summer School.

The critic Denis Scheck described visiting Müller at her home in Berlin and seeing that her desk contained a drawer full of single letters cut from a newspaper she had entirely destroyed in the process. Realising that she used the letters to write texts, he felt he had "entered the workshop of a true poet".

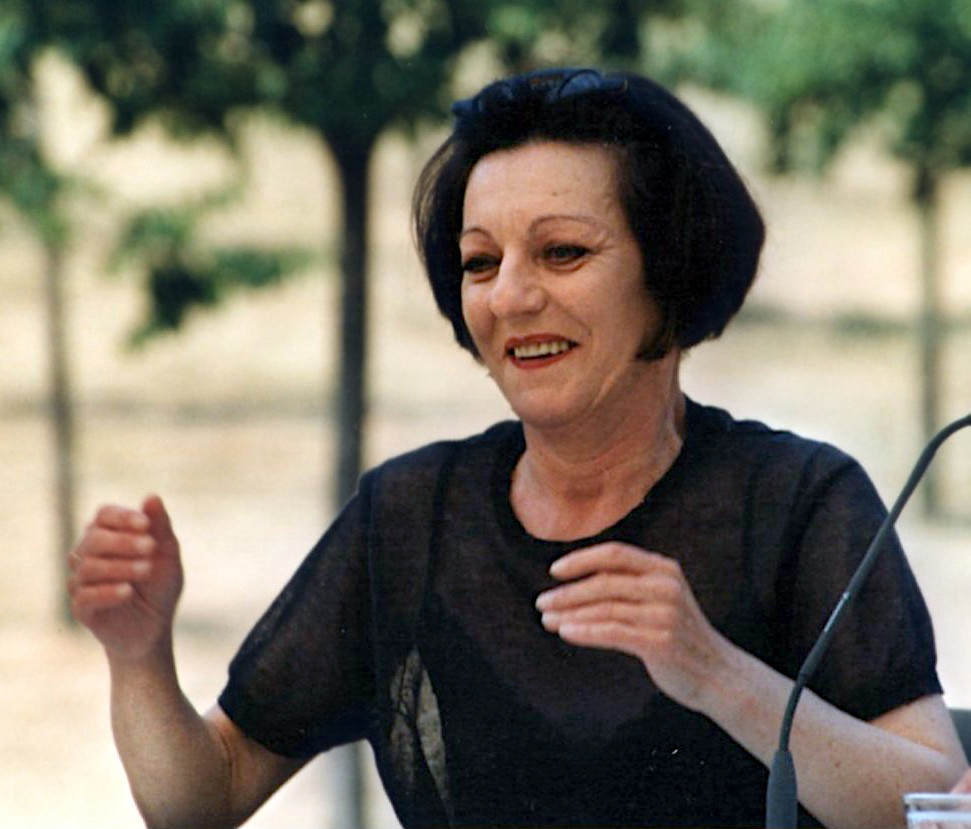
Reading The Hunger Angel, Potsdam, July 2010

The Passport, first published in Germany as Der Mensch ist ein großer Fasan auf der Welt in 1986, is, according to The Times Literary Supplement, "couched in the strange code engendered by repression: indecipherable because there is nothing specific to decipher, it is candid, but somehow beside the point, redolent of things unsaid. From odd observations the villagers sometimes make ("Man is nothing but a pheasant in the world"), to chapters titled after unimportant props ("The Pot Hole", "The Needle"), everything points to a strategy of displaced meaning ... Every such incidence of misdirection is the whole book in miniature," for although Ceausescu is only mentioned in one paragraph (in the chapter "A Big House"), he is central to the story, and cannot be forgotten. "The resulting sense that anything, indeed everything – whether spoken by the characters or described by the author – is potentially dense with tacit significance means this short novel expands in the mind to occupy an emotional space far beyond its size or the seeming simplicity of its story."

== 2009 success ==
Müller's nail scissors, which she used to cut words from printed materials, hanging in the Nobel Prize Museum.

In 2009, Müller enjoyed the greatest international success of her career. Her novel Atemschaukel (published in English as The Hunger Angel) was nominated for the German Book Prize and won the Franz Werfel Human Rights Award. In this book, Müller describes the journey of a young man to a gulag in the Soviet Union, the fate of many Germans in Transylvania after World War II. It was inspired by the experience of the poet Oskar Pastior, whose memories she had made notes of, and also by what happened to her own mother.

In October 2009, the Swedish Academy announced its decision to award that year's Nobel Prize in Literature to Müller "who, with the concentration of poetry and the frankness of prose, depicts the landscape of the dispossessed." The academy compared Müller's style and her use of German as a minority language with Franz Kafka and pointed out the influence of Kafka on Müller. The award coincided with the 20th anniversary of the fall of communism. Michael Krüger, head of Müller's publishing house, said: "By giving the award to Herta Müller, who grew up in a German-speaking minority in Romania, the committee has recognized an author who refuses to let the inhumane side of life under communism be forgotten".

In 2012, Müller commented on the Nobel Prize for Mo Yan by saying that the Swedish Academy had apparently chosen an author who 'celebrates censorship'.

On 6 July 2020 a no longer existing Twitter account published the fake news of Herta Müller's death, which was immediately disclaimed by her publisher.

== Influences ==
Although Müller has revealed little about the specific people or books that have influenced her, she has acknowledged the importance of her university studies in German and Romanian literature, and particularly of the contrast between the two languages. "The two languages", the writer says, "look differently even at plants. In Romanian, 'snowdrops' are 'little tears', in German they are 'Schneeglöckchen', which is 'little snow bells', which means we're not only speaking about different words, but about different worlds." (However here she confuses snowdrops with lily-of-the-valley, the latter being called 'little tears' in Romanian.) She continues, "Romanians see a falling star and say that someone has died, with the Germans you make a wish when you see the falling star." Romanian folk music is another influence: "When I first heard Maria Tănase she sounded incredible to me, it was for the first time that I really felt what folklore meant. Romanian folk music is connected to existence in a very meaningful way."

Müller's work was also shaped by the many experiences she shared with her ex-husband, the novelist and essayist Richard Wagner. Both grew up in Romania as members of the Banat Swabian ethnic group and enrolled in German and Romanian literary studies at Timișoara University. Upon graduating, both worked as German-language teachers, and were members of Aktionsgruppe Banat, a literary society that fought for freedom of speech.

Müller's involvement with Aktionsgruppe Banat gave her the courage to write boldly, despite the threats and trouble generated by the Romanian secret police. Although her books are fictional, they are based on real people and experiences. Her 1996 novel, The Land of Green Plums, was written after the deaths of two friends, in which Müller suspected the involvement of the secret police, and one of its characters was based on a close friend from Aktionsgruppe Banat.

== Letter from Liu Xia ==
Herta Müller wrote the foreword for the first publication of the poetry of Liu Xia, wife of the imprisoned Nobel Peace Prize recipient Liu Xiaobo, in 2015. Müller also translated and read a few of Liu Xia’s poems in 2014. On 4 December 2017, a photo of a letter from Liu Xia to Herta Müller in the form of a poem, in which Liu Xia wrote that she was going mad in her solitary life, was posted on Facebook by Chinese dissident Liao Yiwu.

== On 7 October 2023 massacres ==
At the 7 October Forum held in Stockholm on 25 and 26 May 2024, Müller commented on the "unimaginable massacre" committed by Hamas in its "limitless contempt for humanity" in the 7 October attacks and described it comparable to German extermination pogroms. Müller also criticized two progressive groups: Berlin club-goers and Ivy League students. "Hatred of Jews has infiltrated Berlin's nightlife," she said. Furthermore, she stated: "After October 7, the Berlin club scene literally ducked away. Although 364 young people, ravers like them, were massacred at a techno festival, the club association did not comment on it until days later. And even that was just a dull exercise in compulsory action, because antisemitism and Hamas were not even mentioned."

In the Frankfurter Allgemeine Zeitung, she cast doubt on the veracity of images coming out of Gaza. "Hamas controls the selection of images and orchestrates our emotions," she wrote. "Our feelings are their strongest weapon against Israel’.

== Works ==
=== Prose ===
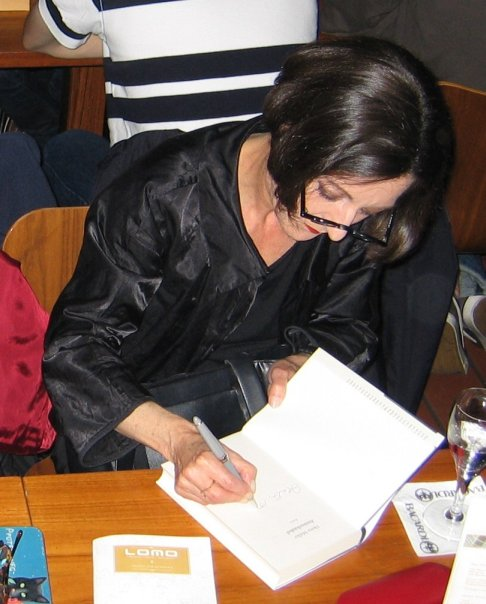
Müller signing one of her books in September 2009

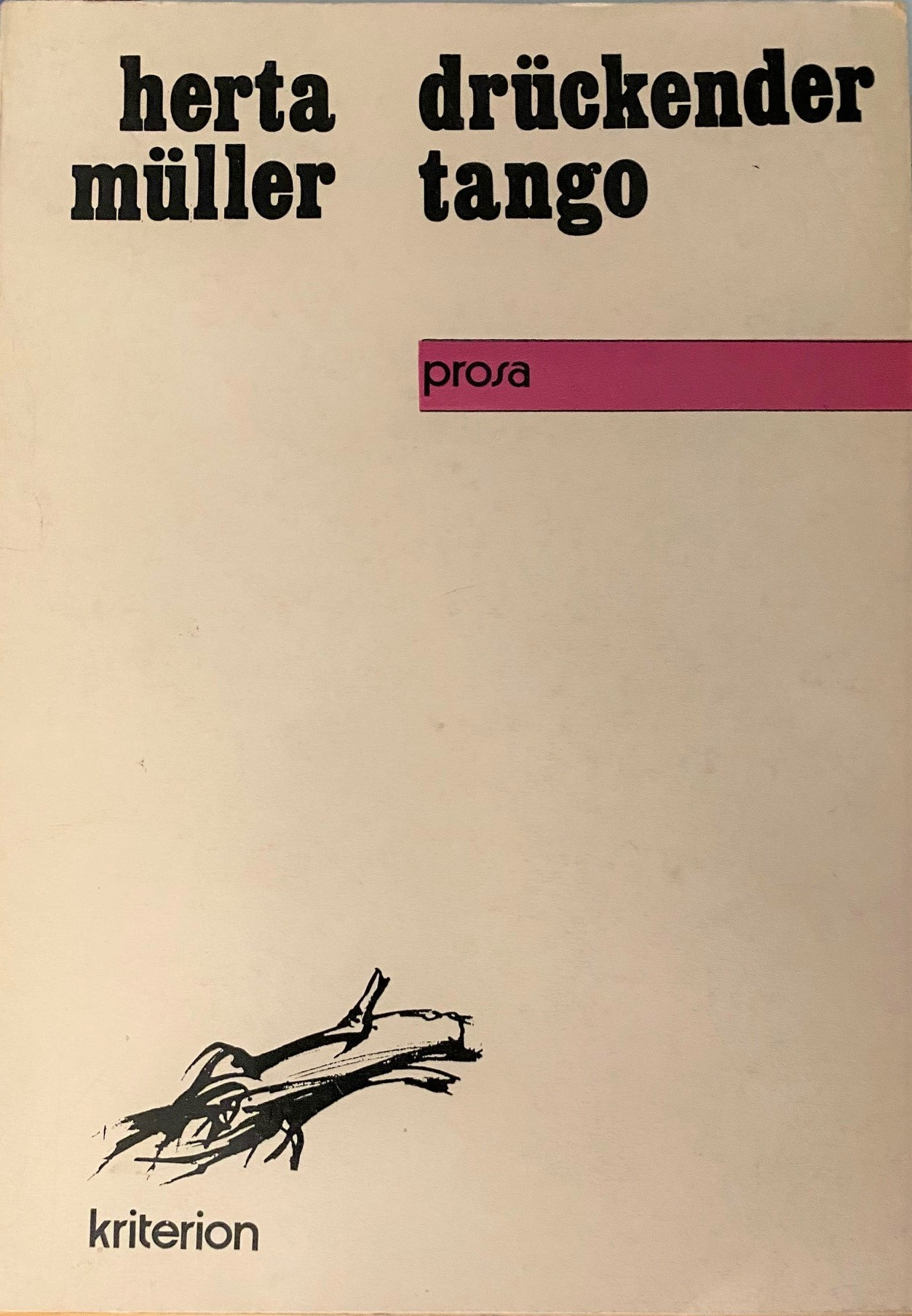
Cover of Drückender Tango, Bukarest 1984

- Niederungen, stories, censored version published in Bucharest, 1982; uncensored version published in Germany, 1984. Translated as Nadirs by Sieglinde Lug (University of Nebraska Press, 1999)
- Drückender Tango ("Oppressive Tango"), stories, Bucharest, 1984
- Der Mensch ist ein großer Fasan auf der Welt, Berlin, 1986. Translated as The Passport by Martin Chalmers (Serpent's Tail, 1989)
- Barfüßiger Februar ("Barefoot February"), Berlin, 1987
- Reisende auf einem Bein, Berlin, 1989. Translated as Traveling on One Leg by Valentina Glajar and Andre Lefevere (Hydra Books/Northwestern University Press, 1998)
- Der Teufel sitzt im Spiegel ("The Devil is Sitting in the Mirror"), Berlin, 1991
- Der Fuchs war damals schon der Jäger, Reinbek bei Hamburg, 1992. Translated as The Fox Was Ever the Hunter by Philip Boehm (2016)
- Eine warme Kartoffel ist ein warmes Bett ("A Warm Potato Is a Warm Bed"), Hamburg, 1992
- Der Wächter nimmt seinen Kamm ("The Guard Takes His Comb"), Reinbek bei Hamburg, 1993
- Angekommen wie nicht da ("Arrived As If Not There"), Lichtenfels, 1994
- Herztier, Reinbek bei Hamburg, 1994. Translated as The Land of Green Plums by Michael Hofmann (Metropolitan Books/Henry Holt and Company, 1996). Reviewed in The New York Times
- Hunger und Seide ("Hunger and Silk"), essays, Reinbek bei Hamburg, 1995
- In der Falle ("In a Trap"), Göttingen 1996
- Heute wär ich mir lieber nicht begegnet, Reinbek bei Hamburg, 1997. Translated as The Appointment by Michael Hulse and Philip Boehm (Metropolitan Books/Picador, 2001)
- Der fremde Blick oder Das Leben ist ein Furz in der Laterne ("The Foreign View, or Life Is a Fart in a Lantern"), Göttingen, 1999
- Heimat ist das, was gesprochen wird ("Home Is What Is Spoken There"), Blieskastel, 2001
- A Good Person Is Worth as Much as a Piece of Bread, foreword to Kent Klich's Children of Ceausescu, published by Journal, 2001 and Umbrage Editions, 2001.
- Der König verneigt sich und tötet ("The King Bows and Kills"), essays, Munich (and elsewhere), 2003
- Atemschaukel, Munich, 2009. Translated as The Hunger Angel by Philip Boehm (Metropolitan Books, 2012)
- Immer derselbe Schnee und immer derselbe Onkel, 2011

=== Lyrics / found poetry ===
- Im Haarknoten wohnt eine Dame ("A Lady Lives in the Hair Knot"), Rowohlt, Reinbek bei Hamburg, 2000
- Die blassen Herren mit den Mokkatassen ("The Pale Gentlemen with their Espresso Cups"), Carl Hanser Verlag, Munich, 2005
- Este sau nu este Ion ("Is He or Isn't He Ion"), collage-poetry written and published in Romanian, Iași, Polirom, 2005
- Vater telefoniert mit den Fliegen ("Father is calling the Flies"), Carl Hanser Verlag, Munich, 2012
- Father's on the Phone with the Flies: A Selection, Seagull Books, Munich, 2018 (73 collage poems with reproductions of originals)

=== Interviews ===
- Mein Vaterland war ein Apfelkern, with Angelika Klammer (2014). The Village on the Edge of the World, trans. Kate McNaughton (2026)

=== Compilations in English ===
- Cristina and Her Double: Selected Essays, trans. Geoffrey Mulligan (Portobello, 2013)

== Editor ==
- Theodor Kramer: Die Wahrheit ist, man hat mir nichts getan ("The Truth Is No One Did Anything to Me"), Vienna 1999
- Die Handtasche ("The Purse"), Künzelsau 2001
- Wenn die Katze ein Pferd wäre, könnte man durch die Bäume reiten ("If the Cat Were a Horse, You Could Ride Through the Trees"), Künzelsau 2001

== Filmography ==
- 1993: Vulpe – vânător (Der Fuchs war damals schon der Jäger), directed by Stere Gulea, starring Oana Pellea, Dorel Vișan, George Alexandru etc.

== Awards and honours ==
- 1981 Adam Müller-Guttenbrunn Prize of the Timișoara Literature Circle
- 1984 Aspekte-Literaturpreis
- 1985 Rauris Literature Prize
- 1985 Encouragement Prize of the Literature Award of Bremen
- 1987 Ricarda-Huch Prize of Darmstadt
- 1989 Marieluise-Fleißer-Preis of Ingolstadt
- 1989 German Language Prize, together with Gerhardt Csejka, Helmuth Frauendorfer, Klaus Hensel, Johann Lippet, Werner Söllner, William Totok, Richard Wagner
- 1990 Roswitha Medal of Knowledge of Bad Gandersheim
- 1991 Kranichsteiner Literature Prize
- 1993 Critical Prize for Literature
- 1994 Kleist Prize
- 1995 Aristeion Prize
- 1995/96 Stadtschreiber von Bergen
- 1997 Literature Prize of Graz
- 1998 Ida-Dehmel Literature Prize and the International Dublin Literary Award for The Land of Green Plums
- 2001 Cicero Speaker Prize
- 2002 Carl-Zuckmayer-Medaille of Rhineland-Palatinate
- 2003 Joseph-Breitbach-Preis (together with Christoph Meckel and Harald Weinrich)
- 2004 Literature Prize of Konrad-Adenauer-Stiftung
- 2005 Berlin Literature Prize
- 2006 Würth Prize for European Literature und Walter-Hasenclever Literature Prize
- 2009 Nobel Prize in Literature
- 2009 Franz Werfel Human Rights Award, in particular for her novel The Hunger Angel
- 2010 Hoffmann von Fallersleben Prize
- 2013 Best Translated Book Award, shortlist, The Hunger Angel
- 2014 Hannelore Greve Literature Prize
- 2021 Pour le Mérite for Sciences and Arts
- 2022: Prize for Understanding and Tolerance, Jewish Museum Berlin
- 2022 Brückepreis

== See also ==
- List of female Nobel laureates
- List of Nobel laureates in Literature
