= Markus Michael Fischer =

German author and professor

Markus Fischer
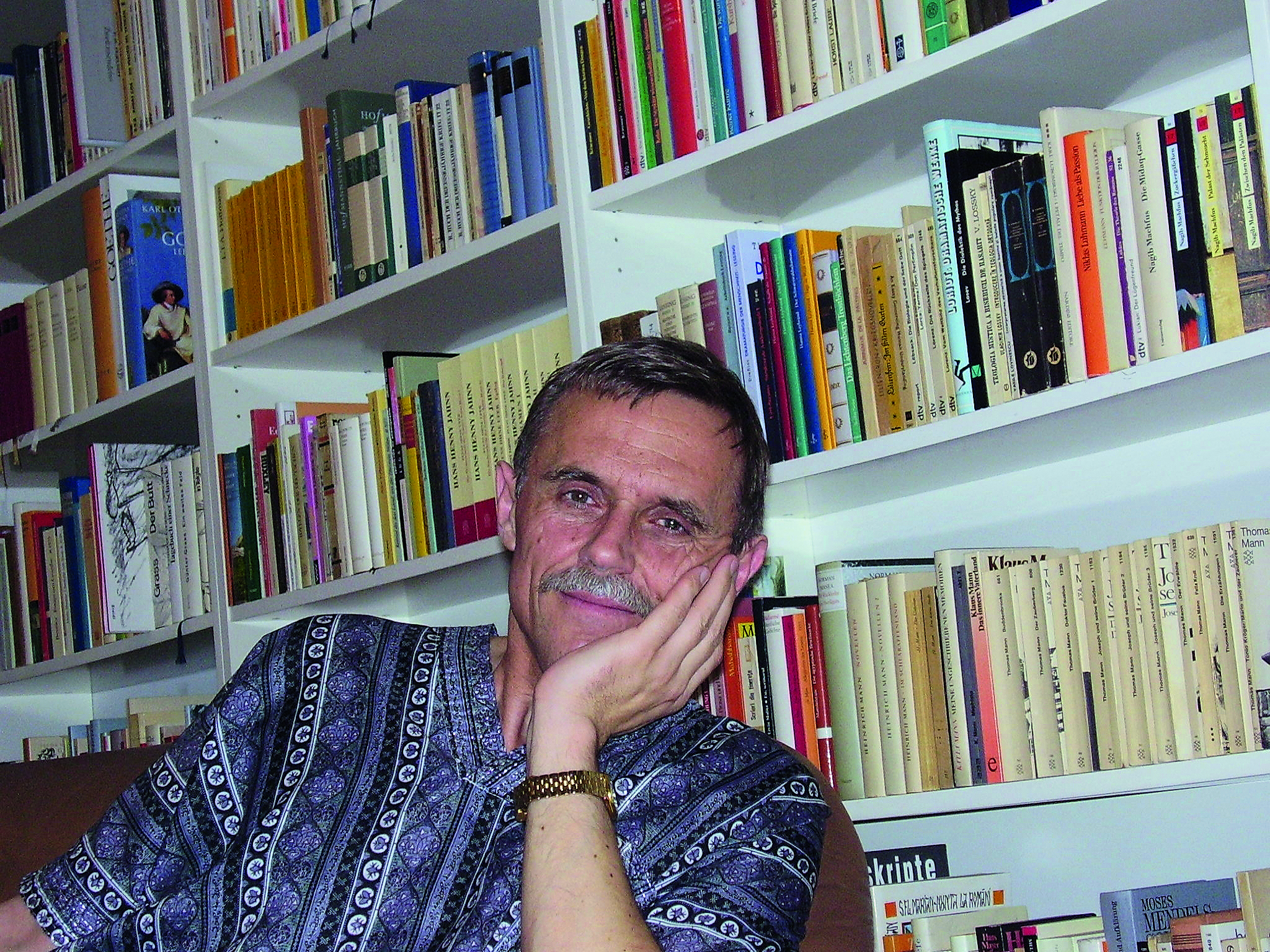
- Education: University of Tübingen; University of Cambridge
- Occupations: Professor, writer, researcher
- Writing career
- Language: German, English, French, Romanian, Arabic
- Genres: German studies, theology, pedagogy

Markus Fischer is a German author of multiple books, as well as a contributor to various volumes He is professor at the faculty of foreign languages and literatures at the University of Bucharest.

== Professional experience ==
- 1986–1987 – Visiting lecturer at the University of Tübingen, German Department
- 1987–1992 – Director of the Course for German Language and Culture at the University of Heidelberg
- 1992–1997 – DAAD lecturer at the German Department of the University of Bucharest
- 1997–2000 – Lecturer at the Institute for German as a Foreign Language Philology, University of Heidelberg
- 2000–2005 – DAAD lecturer at the German Department of the University of Cairo
- 2005–2008 – Lecturer at the Institute for German as a Foreign Language Philology, University of Heidelberg
- 2008–today – Freelancer at the German daily newspaper ADZ ("Allgemeine Deutsche Zeitung für Rumänien")
- 2011–2012 – Pedagogical director of the private German school "Deutsche Schule Bukarest”
- 2014–2018 – Senior lecturer at the German Department of the University of Bucharest
- Since 2018 – University professor at the German Department of the University of Bucharest

== Education ==
- 1963–1975: School (primary and gymnasium)
- 1976–1978: Studies at the University of Tübingen
- 1978–1979: Studies at the University of Cambridge
- 1979–1982: Studies at the University of Tübingen
- 1982–1986: PhD "magna cum laude" at the Faculty of Philology of the University of Tübingen
- 2017: Habilitation (Dr. habil.) at the University of Bucharest

== Bibliography ==
=== Books ===
- Augenblicke um 1900. Literatur, Philosophie, Psychoanalyse und Lebenswelt zur Zeit der Jahrhundertwende, Frankfurt am Main, Bern, New York 1986 (Tübinger Studien zur deutschen Literatur, vol. .11).
- Celan-Lektüren. Reden, Gedichte und Übersetzungen Paul Celans im poetologischen und literarhistorischen Kontext, Berlin 2014 (Literaturwissenschaft, vol. 38).

=== Contributions ===
- " 'Mein Tagebuch enthält fast nur absolut persönliches'. Zur Lektüre von Arthur Schnitzlers Tagebüchern", in: Text+Kritik, ed. by Heinz Ludwig Arnold, nos. 138/139: Arthur Schnitzler, April 1998, pp. 24–35.
- " 'Keime aus russischem Boden' – Zum Rußlandbild des Naturalismus", in: Russen und Rußland aus deutscher Sicht. 19./20. Jahrhundert: Von der Bismarckzeit bis zum Ersten Weltkrieg, ed. by Mechthild Keller, (West-östliche Spiegelungen, ed. by. Lew Kopelew, series A, vol. 4), Munich 2000, pp. 642–671.
- ""Latinität und walachisches Volkstum – Zur Gestalt Mandrykas in Hofmannsthals lyrischer Komödie Arabella", in: Hofmannsthal. Jahrbuch zur europäischen Moderne 8/2000, pp. 199–213.
- " 'Blieb nur der Städtehimmel, dieser kolossale Rachen' – Zur Großstadtthematik im Werk Durs Grünbeins", in: Historische Gedächtnisse sind Palimpseste. Festschrift for the 70th birthday of Gotthart Wunberg, ed. by Roland S. Kamzelak, Paderborn 2001, pp. 21–41.
- "Der Wanderer, seine Rede und ihr Schatten – Bemerkungen zu Texten von Büchner, Nietzsche, Kafka und Celan", in: Philosophie, Kunst und Wissenschaft. Memorial publication for Heinrich Kutzner, ed. by Richard Faber, Brigitte Niestroj and Peter Pörtner, Würzburg 2001, pp. .101–110.
- " 'Also sind wir Multikulti oder nicht?' – Zur Ethnologie der Identität in Richard Wagners Roman Das reiche Mädchen", in: Minderheitenliteraturen – Grenzerfahrung und Reterritorialisierung. Festschrift for Stefan Sienerth, ed. by George Gutu et al., Bukarest 2008, pp. 227–244.
- "Glauben und Wissen in Kafkas Prosastück Das Schweigen der Sirenen", in: Glauben und Wissen. Zum Verhältnis dieser Begriffe in der klassischen deutschen Philosophie, ed. by Daniel N. Razeev, Saint Petersburg 2008, pp. 289–292.
- "Zigeunerfiguren im Romanwerk von Catalin Dorian Florescu", in: 'Zigeuner' und Nation. Repräsentation – Inklusion – Exklusion, ed. by Herbert Uerlings and Iulia-Karin Patrut, Frankfurt a. M. 2008, pp. 445–468.

=== Scientific articles ===
- Deutschsprachige Literatur arabischer Migranten und die ägyptische Germanistik, in: West-östlicher Seiltanz. Deutsch-arabischer Kulturaustausch im Schnittpunkt Kairo, hg. von Alexander Haridi, Bonn 2005, PAG.103–106.
- „Es ist eine mythische Landschaft, die nur versteht, wer dort geboren wurde.“ – Hans Bergels Siebenbürgen-Epos Die Wiederkehr der Wölfe als europäischer Zeitroman, in: Spiegelungen. Zeitschrift für deutsche Kultur und Geschichte Südosteuropas, 2/2007, Heft 1, PAG.21–28.
- Ironie als Grabschmuck. Zur Gegenwartsbewältigung in Johann Lippets Erzählung Der Totengräber (1997), in: Interkulturelle Grenzgänge. Akten der wissenschaftlichen Tagung des Bukarester Instituts für Germanistik zum 100. Gründungstag, hg. von George Gutu und Doina Sandu, Bukarest 2007, PAG.153–164.
- Das Eigene im Fremden. Zur Dialektik des Ägyptenbildes in Ingeborg Bachmanns unvollendetem Roman Der Fall Franza, in: Transcarpathica. Germanistisches Jahrbuch Rumänien 3–4/2004–2005, hg. von Andrei Corbea-Hoisie und Alexander Rubel, Bukarest 2008, PAG. 112–132.
- Interkulturalität und west-östliche Thematik im Romanwerk von Catalin Dorian Florescu, in: Transcarpathica. Germanistisches Jahrbuch Rumänien 5–6/2006–2007, hg. von Roxana Nubert und Johannes Lutz, Bukarest 2009, PAG.24–35.
- „Die Völker fangen wieder an zu wandern“ – Dimensionen des Wandermotivs in der frühen Lyrik von Immanuel Weißglas, in: Immanuel Weißglas (1920–1979). Studien zum Leben und Werk, hg. von Andrei Corbea-Hoişie et al., Jassy, Konstanz 2010, PAG.245–258 (= Jassyer Beiträge zur Germanistik XIV).
- Literarische Bilder von Bukarest. Christian Hallers Trilogie des Erinnerns, in: Deutsches Jahrbuch für Rumänien 2011, Bukarest 2011, PAG. 151–154.
- Unerschöpflicher Erzählquell Siebenbürgen. Hans Bergels neuer Geschichtenband Die Wildgans, in: Deutsches Jahrbuch für Rumänien 2012, Bukarest 2012, PAG. 117–120.
- Jüdische Tradition in rumänischer Geschichte und Gegenwart. Das Jüdische Staatstheater Bukarest, in: Deutsches Jahrbuch für Rumänien 2013, Bukarest 2013, PAG. 181–185.

=== Reviews ===
- "Helmut Braun, Ich bin nicht Ranek. Annäherung an Edgar Hilsenrath", in: Spiegelungen. Zeitschrift für deutsche Kultur und Geschichte Südosteuropas, 3/2007, no. 3, pp. 330–332.
- "Irena Brezna, Die beste aller Welten", in: Spiegelungen. Zeitschrift für deutsche Kultur und Geschichte Südosteuropas, 3/2009, no. 3, pp. 291urm.
- "Sándor Márai, Die Möwe", in: Spiegelungen. Zeitschrift für deutsche Kultur und Geschichte Südosteuropas, 4/2009, no. 4, pp .405urm.
- "E. M. Cioran, Über Deutschland. Aufsätze aus den Jahren 1931–1937", in: Spiegelungen. Zeitschrift für deutsche Kultur und Geschichte Südosteuropas, 7/2012, no. 2, pp. 184–186.
- "Cristina Spinei, Über die Zentralität des Peripheren. Auf den Spuren von Gregor von Rezzori", in: Spiegelungen. Zeitschrift für deutsche Kultur und Geschichte Südosteuropas, 7/2012, no. 4, pp. 424–426.

=== Translations ===
- Nicolae Iorga, Czernowitz, in: Czernowitz. Jüdisches Städtebild, hg. von Andrei Corbea-Hoisie, Frankfurt am Main 1998, pag. 119–125.
