= Eine warme Kartoffel ist ein warmes Bett =

Book by Herta Müller

- First edition
- Author: Herta Müller
- Language: German
- Genre: Essay collection
- Publisher: Europäische Verlagsanstalt, Hamburg
- Publication date: 1992
- Pages: 77
- ISBN: 978-3-434-50014-8

Eine warme Kartoffel ist ein warmes Bett (A Warm Potato is a Warm Bed) is a collection of essays by Nobel Prize-winning author Herta Müller, first published in 1992. The essays were previously published as columns in the monthly Swiss publication Du between 1990 and 1992.

The title comes from one of the cryptic phrases that Müller's mother used in discussing the gulags of the Socialist Republic of Romania. The title essay, written in 1991, was later expanded into a 304-page prose poem called Atemschaukel (The Hunger Angel).
