= Traveling on One Leg =

Novel by Herta Müller

Traveling on One Leg (German: Reisende auf einem Bein) is a novel by Nobel Prize-winning author Herta Müller, published in German in 1989 by Rotbuch Verlag. An English translation was made available in 1998.

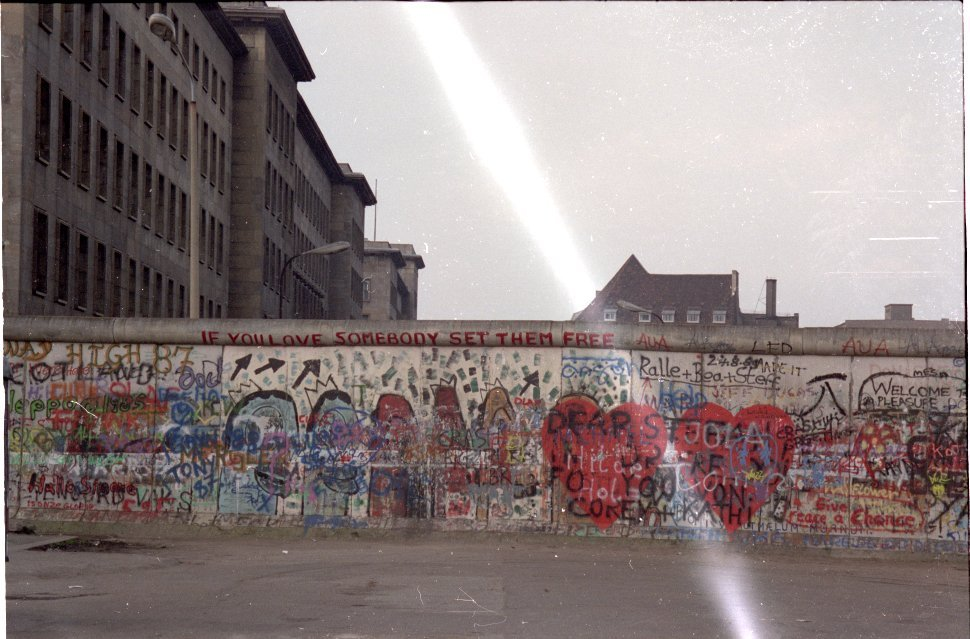
Part of the Berlin Wall, 1988. The protagonist Irene visits an acquaintance from whose flat the wall can be seen.

The protagonist Irene is a German-speaking woman in her mid-thirties who has just emigrated from Romania to West Germany and starts living in Berlin in the second half of the 1980s. Traveling on One Leg explores the themes of exile, homeland, and identity, and the protagonist's unsuccessful acquaintance or relationship with three different men.

Irene seeks to escape her traumatisation by creating a collage from newspaper clippings. By the creative process she experiments on what a fluid subjectivity might feel like. Irene can only live in the here and now by denying that she wishes to understand her life and keep in control. So the collage's dynamics between design and serendipity attract her attention and provide some kind of consolation.

Published after Müller's emigration to Germany, it is cited in 2010's History of the Literary Cultures of East Central Europe, along with Der Teufel sitzt im Spiegel and The Land of Green Plums, as drawing attention to her work in the West. The novel, one of several for which the author was known when winning the Nobel in 2009, was published in English in 1998 by Hydra Books/Northwestern University Press, translated by Valentina Glajar and André Lefevere.

== Translations ==
First edition

- 1990 Rejsende på et ben, translated into Danish by Nanna Thirup
- 1991 Resande på ett ben, translated into Swedish by Karin Löfdahl
- 1992 Reizigster op één been: roman, translated into Dutch by Gerda Meijerink
- 1993 In viaggio su una gamba sola, translated into Italian by Lidia Castellani
- 1993 Μετέωροι ταξιδιώτες, translated into Greek by Katerina Chatzē
- 1998 Traveling on one leg, translated into English by Valentina Glajar and André Lefevere
- 2010 Călătorie într-un picior, translated into Romanian by Corina Bernic
- 2010 独腿旅行的人, together with Die Welt ist ein großer Fasan, translated into Chinese by Min Chen und Ni A
- 2013 Tek bacaklı yolcu, translated into Turkish by Çağlar Tanyeri
- 2015 Патничка на една нога, translated into Macedonian by Boban Zdravkovski Andreevski
