= Franz Werfel Human Rights Award =

German human rights award

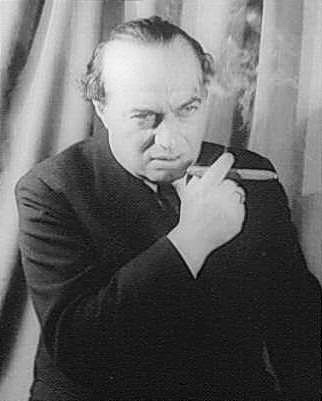
Franz Werfel (1890–1945)

The Franz Werfel Human Rights Award (German: Franz-Werfel-Menschenrechtspreis) is a human rights award of the German Federation of Expellees' Centre Against Expulsions project. It is awarded to individuals or groups in Europe who, through political, artistic, philosophical or practical work, have opposed breaches of human rights by genocide, ethnic cleansing, and the deliberate destruction of national, ethnic, racial or religious groups.

== The prize ==
The foundations of the prize are considered to be the Fourth Hague Convention of 1907, the Universal Declaration of Human Rights of 1948, the International Agreement on Civilian and Political Rights of 1966, the resolution of the United Nations Commission on Human Rights of 1998 as well as the consequences of the meeting of the European Council of the Heads of State and Governments in Copenhagen of 1993 and other statements issued by the European Union.

The award is named after the famous Austrian author Franz Werfel (1890–1945), whose novel The Forty Days of Musa Dagh famously portrayed the displacement of the Armenians from Turkey and the genocide of the Armenians in 1915/16.

The award includes €10,000 of prize money, and is awarded in the Paulskirche in Frankfurt every second year. It was first awarded in 2003.

== Jury ==
=== 2010 ===
- Otto von Habsburg (CSU), former member of the European Parliament, Chairman of the International Paneuropean Union, former crown prince of Austria-Hungary (deceased)
- Klaus Hänsch (SPD), former president of the European Parliament
- Helga Hirsch, a journalist, former Poland correspondent of Die Zeit and Die Welt
- Milan Horáček, a founding member of the German Green Party, former MEP
- Hilmar Kopper, former chairman of Deutsche Bank
- Rüdiger Safranski, philosopher and author
- Erika Steinbach (CDU), a member of the German Parliament and chairwoman of the Federation of Expellees

=== Former jury members ===
- Peter Glotz (SPD), a professor, former senator, MP and Secretary General of the SPD (2003–2005, deceased)
- Daniel Cohn-Bendit (Greens), chairman of the Green faction in the European Parliament
- György Konrád, a writer and former president of the Akademie der Künste in Berlin (2003–2007, deceased)
- Ralph Giordano, a writer (deceased)
- Lennart Meri, a writer and former president of Estonia (2003–2006, deceased)
- Otto Graf Lambsdorff, former chairman of the Liberal Party and member of the German federal cabinet (2003–2009, deceased)

== Laureates ==
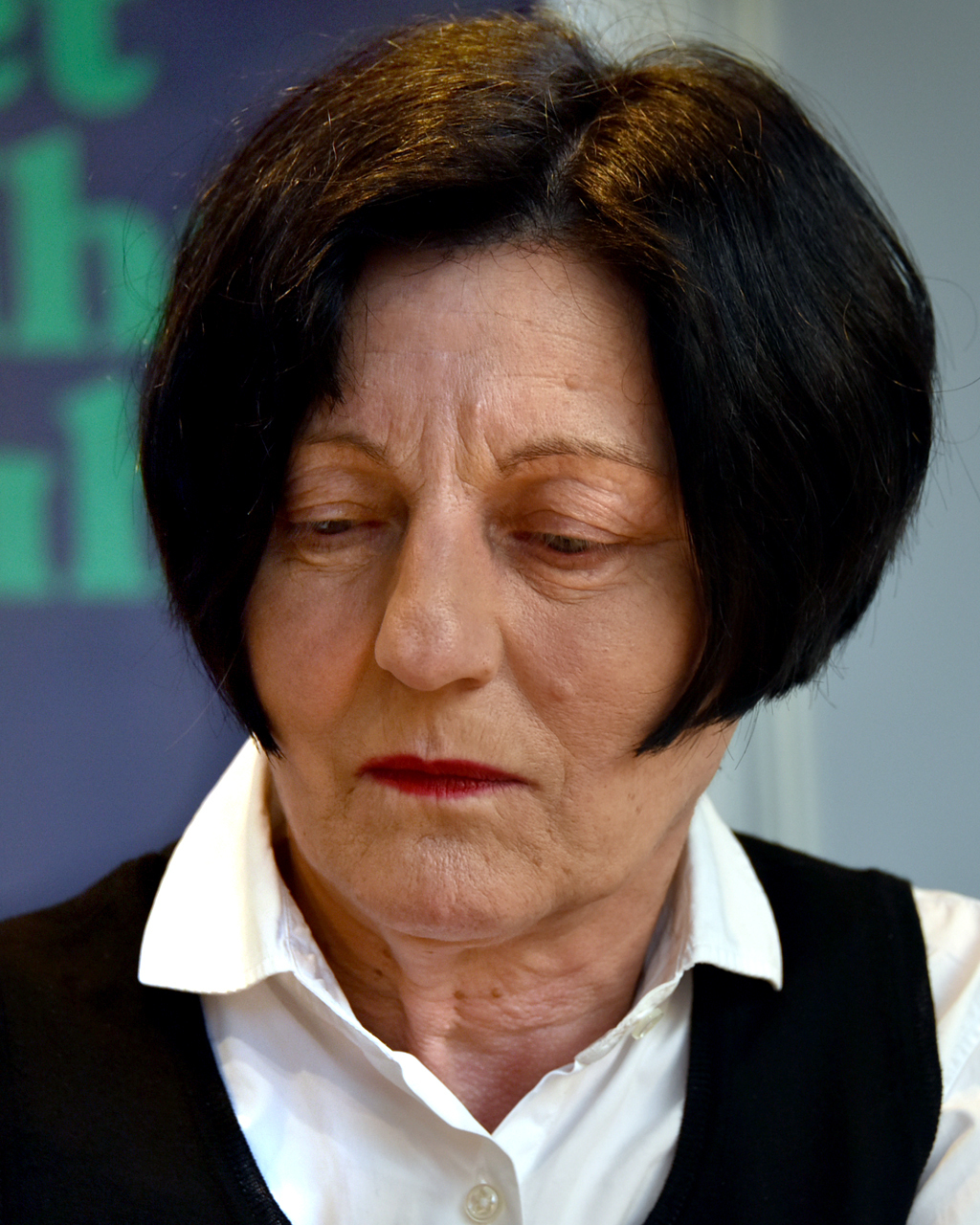
Herta Müller, the 2009 laureate, received the award in particular recognition of her novel Everything I Possess I Carry With Me

- 2003
  - Mihran Dabag (Germany), "for his scientific work in the field of genocide research, on the history of the persecution of Armenians and its current implications"
  - The initiators of the "Cross of Reconciliation" (Kříž smíření in Czech) in Teplice nad Metují, the Czech Republic (Wekelsdorf), for "inaugurating the cross for the Sudeten Germans murdered on the Buková hora (Buchenberg) in 1945 and for all the victims of national conflicts from this region and for making a courageous gesture of dialogue between Germans and Czechs".
    - Věra Vítová, the mayor of Teplice nad Metují
    - Petr Kulíšek, a political activist
    - Jan Piňos, a political activist
- 2005 Franjo Komarica, bishop (Bosnia and Herzegovina)
- 2007 György Konrád
- 2009 Herta Müller in particular for her novel Everything I Possess I Carry With Me
- 2010 David Vondráček
- 2012 Karl Schlögel
- 2014 Rick Ostermann, film director
- 2016 Freya Klier
- 2018 Michael Wolffsohn
- 2019 Nasrin Sotoudeh
- 2021 Joachim Gauck
- 2023 Klaus Iohannis
- 2025 Vitali Klitschko
