= Der König verneigt sich und tötet =

2001 essay by Herta Müller

First edition

Der König verneigt sich und tötet (The King Bows and Kills) is an essay book in German by Nobel Prize-winning author Herta Müller. It was first published in 2003. Translations in Polish and Swedish were published in 2005. Following her 2009 Nobel Prize win, interest in her books rose dramatically, and her publisher announced a translation to English was being considered.

- Müller, Herta (2003) Der König verneigt sich und tötet München: Hanser; 208p. ISBN 978-3-596-17534-5
  - (Swedish) Kungen bugar och dödar (2005) Translator: Karin Löfdahl; Stockholm: Wahlström & Widstrand
