= Oskar Pastior =

German poet and translator

Oskar Pastior (Romanian: [ˈoskar pasˈtjor]; 20 October 1927 – 4 October 2006) was a Romanian-born German poet and translator. He was the only German member of Oulipo.

== Biography ==
Born into a Transylvanian Saxon family in Sibiu (Hermannstadt) in the Kingdom of Romania, he was deported in January 1945, along with many other ethnic Germans in Eastern Europe, to the USSR for forced labor. He returned to Romania in 1949, and went on to study German studies at the University of Bucharest in 1955. After graduation, he worked for the German language service of the Romanian Radio Broadcasting Company. In 1964, he published his first collection of poems, "Offne Worte".

After having been under surveillance by the Securitate for 4 years, Pastior became an informer for the Securitate in 1961 with the alias "Otto Stein". This became known in 2010, years after his death.

He was an informer until 1968, when he obtained a scholarship to Vienna and defected from Communist Romania.

Pastior left for Germany, living at first in Munich, then in West Berlin, where he lived the rest of his life. He was known for his translations of Romanian literature into German (among others, the works of Tudor Arghezi, George Coşbuc, Tristan Tzara, Gellu Naum, Marin Sorescu, and Urmuz).

He received the highly prestigious Georg Büchner Prize in 2006.

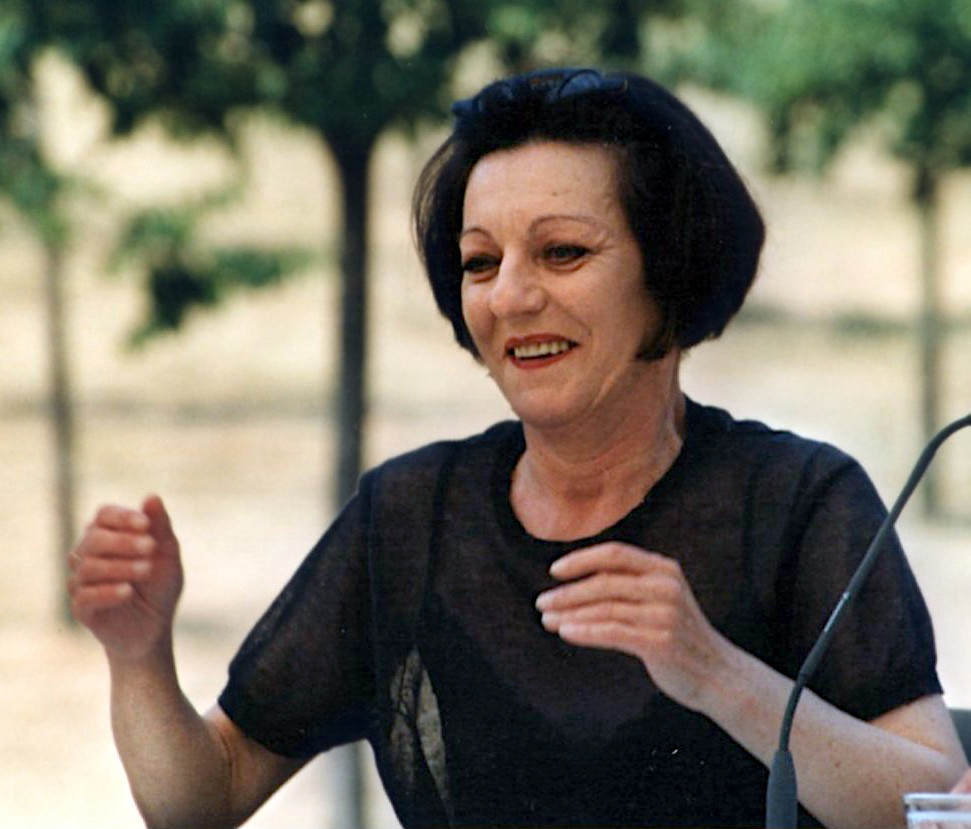
Herta Müller, reading, "Everything I Possess I Carry With Me", Potsdam, July 2010

The Hunger Angel, the 2009 novel of Nobel Prize-winning author Herta Müller, is based partly upon Pastior's experiences as a forced laborer in the USSR. Initially, Pastior and Müller had planned to write a book about his experiences together, but he died in 2006 in Frankfurt.

Herta Müller said she thought that Pastior, as a homosexual, was vulnerable and susceptible to blackmail (in Romania, homosexuality was punishable by several years in prison).

== Selected works ==
- Pastior, Oskar; Mathews, Harry; Middleton, Christopher; Waldrop, Rosmarie; Yau, John (2001). Many glove compartments : selected poems. Providence, R.I.: Burning Deck. ISBN 1-886224-44-7. OCLC 48569855.
- Pastior, Oskar; Green, Malcolm (1990). Poempoems. London: Atlas Press. ISBN 0-947757-37-6. OCLC 37726173.
