= Hunger und Seide =

First edition

Hunger und Seide is a book of essays (or, "mixed prose") by Nobel Prize-winning author Herta Müller. It was first published in 1995.
