= Die blassen Herren mit den Mokkatassen =

2005 poem and art anthology by Herta Müller

First edition

Die blassen Herren mit den Mokkatassen is a book of poems and collage art by Nobel Prize-winning author Herta Müller. It was first published in 2005.
