= Im Haarknoten wohnt eine Dame =

2005 book by Nobel Prize-winning author Herta Müller

First edition

Im Haarknoten wohnt eine Dame (lit. 'In the Topknots Lives a Lady') is a book by Nobel Prize-winning author Herta Müller. It was first published by Rowohlt Verlag in 2000. Like many of Müller's books it focuses on Romanian-Germans and their past involvement with Nazism.
