= Immer derselbe Schnee und immer derselbe Onkel =

2011 book by Herta Müller

- First edition
- Author: Herta Müller
- Language: German
- Publisher: Carl Hanser Verlag
- Publication date: March 7, 2011
- Media type: Print, Audiobook
- Pages: 256 pages
- ISBN: 978-3446235649

Immer derselbe Schnee und immer derselbe Onkel (English translation: Always the Same Snow and always the Same Uncle) is a book of essays by Nobel Prize-winning author Herta Müller. The book was first published in Germany on March 7, 2011, through Carl Hanser Verlag.

Critical reception for the book was positive. Ö1 praised the collection, calling the title "peculiar and beautiful" and stated that her writing was "direct and pragmatic".
