= Der fremde Blick oder Das Leben ist ein Furz in der Laterne =

1999 book by Herta Müller

First edition

Der fremde Blick oder Das Leben ist ein Furz in der Laterne (The foreign gaze or life is a fart in a lantern) is a book by German Nobel Prize-winning author Herta Müller. It was first published in 1999. The book has received praise for its persuasiveness and its ability to explain why her Romanian past influences her writing style.
