= Der Wächter nimmt seinen Kamm =

Book by Herta Müller

First edition

Der Wächter nimmt seinen Kamm is a book by Nobel Prize-winning author Herta Müller. It was first published in 1993.
