= Kent Klich =

Swedish photographer (born 1952)

Kent Klich (born 1952) is a Swedish photographer living in Copenhagen.

== Life and work ==
Klich studied psychology at the University of Gothenburg and worked with adolescent children before turning to photography. He joined Magnum Photos in 1998 and left in 2002. His work is noted for a strong commitment to social issues and has worked with street children in Mexico and drug addicts in Denmark. In 2001 he collaborated with the author Herta Müller on a project and book Children of Ceausescu detailing the HIV crisis among Romanian children.

== Solo exhibitions ==
- 1998: Street children, Mexico, Stockholm City Museum, Stockholm, Sweden, 1999; Center for Photography, Copenhagen, Denmark, 1999; Wermlands Museum, Sweden, 1999; Center for Photography, Örebro, Sweden, 2000; Dunya Kitabevi, Istanbul, Turkey, 2000; City Hall, Sundsvall, Sweden, 2001.
- 2001: Children of Ceausescu, The Swedish Cultural Institute, Paris, 2001; The Photo Museum, Sundsvall, Sweden, 2007; Tensta Konsthall, Stockholm. 2010.
- 2001: Work in progress, Beth, Fotografevi, Istanbul, Turkey.
- 2004: "El niño" (Kaunas Photo Days 2004: Nordic Image), Kaunas House of Jesuits, Kaunas, Lithuania.
- 2006: A Family Story / Picture Imperfect, Nikolaj Copenhagen Contemporary Art Center, Denmark; Museum of Work, Norrköping, Sweden, 2006.
- 2007: A Family Story, Kunsthallen Brænderigården, Viborg, Denmark.
- 2008: Out of Sight Out of Mind, exhibition on the streets in the city of Copenhagen / The Danish Architecture Center, Denmark; Museum of Malmö, Sweden, 2008.
- 2009: Mexico/Out of sight, Landskrona museum, Landskrona, Sweden.
- 2009: Gaza: Boningar, Tegen 2, Stockholm.
- 2010: Gaza Photo Album, Umbrage Gallery, New York; Hasselblad Center, Gothenburg, Sweden, 2010.
- 2012: Killing time, Tegen2, Stockholm.
- 2013: Ceausescus barn, Malmö Museer, Malmö, Sweden.

== Publications ==
- The book of Beth
  - Beths bok. [Oslo]: Oktober, 1988. ISBN 9788270944798. (in Bokmål)
  - Beths bok. Stockholm: Norstedts, 1988. ISBN 978-91-1-883442-4. (in Swedish)
  - Beths bog. Copenhagen: Tiderne skifter, 1988. ISBN 8774453424. (in Danish)
  - The book of Beth. New York: Aperture, 1989. ISBN 0893813702. (in English)
- El Niño, text by Elena Poniatowska
  - El Niño: En berättelse om gatubarn i Mexico City. Stockholm: Journal, 1999. ISBN 9197239569. (in Swedish)
  - El Niño: En beretning om gadebørn i Mexico City. Copenhagen: Tiderne Skifter, 1999. ISBN 8774458361. (in Danish)
  - El Niño, Children of the streets, Mexico City = El Niño: Niños de la calle, Ciudad de México. Syracuse: Syracuse University Press, 1999. ISBN 0815605927. (in English and Spanish)
- Children of Ceausescu, foreword by Herta Müller
  - Ceausescus barn. Stockholm: Journal, 2001. ISBN 9789197418225. (in Swedish)
  - Children of Ceausescu. New York: Umbrage, 2001. ISBN 9781884167102; ISBN 9789197418218. (in English)
- Historien om et menneske: Eller når to plus to bliver fem. Copenhagen: Kunsthallen Nikolaj, 2006. ISBN 8788860817. Text by Mette Sandbye. (in Danish and English)
- Picture imperfect / Beth R. (book and DVD). With Kim Fupz Aakeson.
  - Picture imperfect. Stockholm: Journal, 2007. ISBN 9197577065. (in Swedish and English)
  - Beth R. Copenhagen: Politisk Revy, 2008. ISBN 8773783099. (in Danish)
- Out of sight. Stockholm: Journal, 2008. Published together with Dogwalk by Tina Enghoff. Text by Carole Naggar. ISBN 9197762539; ISBN 9197762520. (in English)
- Gaza photo album
  - Gaza photo album. Stockholm: Journal, 2009. ISBN 919776258X. (in Swedish)
  - Gaza photo album. Copenhagen: Politisk Revy, 2009. ISBN 8773783234. (in Danish)
  - Gaza photo album. New York: Umbrage, 2010. ISBN 1884167861. (in English)
- Världens mitt finns inte påkartan. Stockholm: Mormor, 2009. ISBN 9185841323. Text by Göran Odbratt. (in Swedish)
- Where I am now. Little Journey no. 7. Munich: Bellyband, 2012. ISBN 978-3-9812498-6-6.
- Gaza Works. Berlin: Koenig, 2017. ISBN 978-3960981442.

== Prizes and awards ==
- 2002 Prize, the Museum of Work’s documentary photography prize, Norrköping, Sweden.
- 2003 Prize, the city of Västerås, Sweden.
- 2003 Grant, Hasselblad Foundation, Gothenburg, Sweden.
- 2003 Grant, Sveriges Författarfond, Stockholm, Sweden.
- 2004 Grant, Sveriges Författarfond, Stockholm, Sweden.
- 2005 Prize, Fogtdals Forlag, Copenhagen, Denmark.
- 2006 5-year grant, the Arts Grants Committee, Stockholm, Sweden.
- 2006 Special mention, Beths dagbog (Beth's Diary), 17th Nordisk Panorama Film Festival, Århus, Denmark.
- 2006 GuldDok for Best Short Film in Copenhagen Denmark, Beths dagbog (Beth's Diary).
- 2008 ”Fotofrühling” The Kassel Fotoforum, Picture Imperfect among the 22 best photobooks of 2007/08.
- 2009 Picture Imperfect winner of The Swedish Photo Book Prize
- 2010 First prize, General News Singles, World Press Photo awards (for a photograph of Gaza City)
- 2017: Special Mention for Author's Book Award, Rencontres d'Arles Book Award, for Gaza Works.
