= Vater telefoniert mit den Fliegen =

2012 collection of poems by Herta Müller

- first edition
- Author: Herta Müller
- Language: German
- Genre: Poetry, collage
- Publisher: Carl Hanser Verlag, Munich
- Publication date: August 2012
- Pages: 192
- ISBN: 978-3-446-23857-2

Vater telefoniert mit den Fliegen (Father's on the Phone with the Flies) is a collection of collage poems by Nobel Prize-winning writer Herta Müller first published in 2012. The 191 collages are divided between five sections. As with most of Müller's work, one of the collection's underlying themes is political, stemming from her experience living under the dictatorship of Nicolae Ceaușescu in Communist Romania.

A selection of 73 of the poems was published in English in 2018, translated by Thomas Cooper, alongside the German originals.
