= Der Teufel sitzt im Spiegel =

Book by Herta Müller

First edition

Der Teufel sitzt im Spiegel (lit. 'The Devil Sits in the Mirror') is a book by Nobel Prize-winning author Herta Müller. It was first published in 1991 after Müller's emigration to Germany and is cited in 2010's History of the Literary Cultures of East Central Europe, along with Traveling on One Leg and The Land of Green Plums, as drawing attention to her work in the West. Titled for a cautionary proverb which Müller's grandmother used to say to her—a warning against a variety of evils including vanity, sexual self-awareness and self-reflection in general, each of which could precede a fall, the book is a collection of essays about writing and literature built around the theme.

According to 1997's Gender and Germanness, Müller views the proverb politically, focusing on its use by those in power—grandmothers or governments—to repress non-conformity, permitting them to impose a constructed identity unchallenged by self-evaluation.

Der Teufel sitzt im Spiegel takes its subtitle, "Wie Wahrnehmung sich erfindet" ("How Perception Invents Itself") from a text it includes that was originally given as a lecture series.

== Sources ==
- Herminghouse, Patricia; Mueller, Magda (1997). Gender and Germanness: Cultural Productions of Nation. Berghahn Books. ISBN 978-1-57181-113-4.
- Cornis-Pope, Marcel; Neubauer, John (29 September 2010). History of the Literary Cultures of East Central Europe: Junctures and Disjunctures in the 19th and 20th Century. Vol. IV: Types and Stereotypes. John Benjamins Publishing Company. ISBN 978-90-272-3458-2.
