= Angekommen wie nicht da =

1994 book by Herta Müller

- Author: Herta Müller
- Language: German
- Publisher: Meranier-Gymnasium
- Publication date: 1994

Angekommen wie nicht da (Arrived as if not there) is a 1994 book by German Nobel Prize-winning author Herta Müller.

== Release details ==
- — (1994). Angekommen wie nicht da. Vol. 9, Leseheft des Meranier-Gymnasiums zur Dichterlesung (in German). Meranier-Gymnasium Lichtenfels. DNB-IDN 958353530.
