= Este sau nu este Ion =

2005 poetry collection by Herta Müller

- Cover
- Author: Herta Müller
- Language: Romanian
- Genre: Poetry
- Publisher: Polirom
- Publication date: 2005
- Publication place: Romania

Este sau nu este Ion (lit. 'It is or it is not John') is a poetry collection in Romanian by the Nobel Prize-winning author Herta Müller. It was first published in 2005 by Polirom.
