= Theodor Kramer =

Austrian poet (1897–1958)

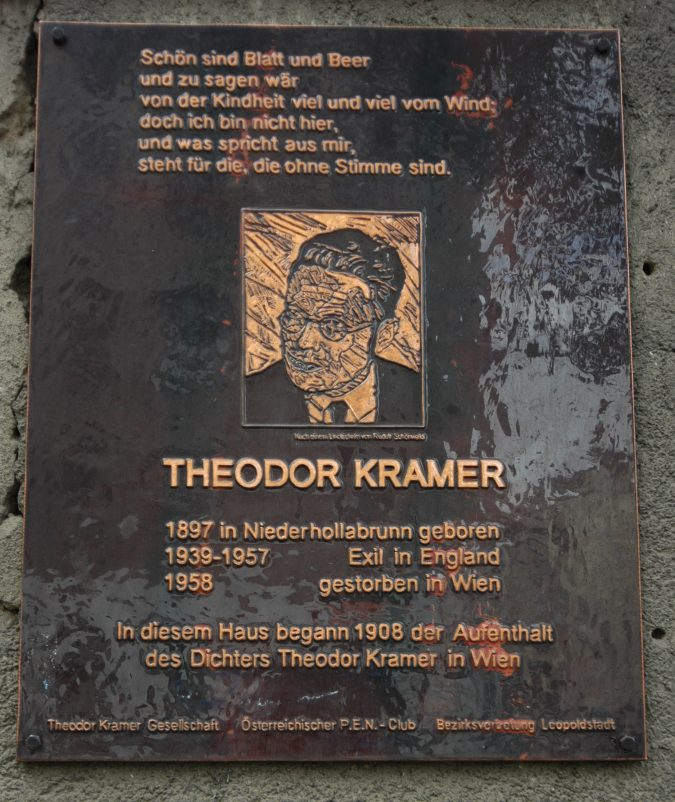
Theodor Kramer Memorial (Vienna-Leopoldstadt, Am Tabor)

Theodor Kramer (1 January 1897 – 3 April 1958) was an Austrian poet of Jewish origin. He was persecuted during the Second World War and fled to the United Kingdom. After his death his significant poetic output fell into obscurity, but has been rediscovered in recent decades. Several of his poems have been set to music.

== Biography ==
Theodor Kramer was born on 1 January 1897. His father was the village doctor of Niederhollabrunn in the Weinviertel region of Lower Austria. After completing his secondary education with the matura examination he served as an officer in the Austrian army until the end of the war. After the war, he began to study Germanic philology and governmental studies, but curtailed his university education to work as a civil servant and later a book retailer. From 1931 he earned his living by writing. His literary output, almost exclusively poetry, brought him significant success and he became well known in the German-speaking world.

After the Anschluss with Nazi Germany, Kramer – a Jew and Social Democrat – was forbidden to work. In 1939, he was able against all the odds to secure emigration to the United Kingdom, first for his wife and then for himself. From 1940 to 1941, he was imprisoned as an enemy alien. In 1943, he started work as a college librarian in Guildford. In 1946, he took British citizenship, and stayed in the same job until 1957. He was on the governing body of the Austrian PEN club, an association of persecuted writers. He was in close contact with other members of the club like Elias Canetti, Erich Fried and Hilde Spiel. In the 1950s he gradually withdrew from social contact and his health deteriorated. In 1957, he was recalled to Vienna, where he received an honorary pension. He died in Vienna on 3 April 1958 and was buried in the Vienna Central Cemetery (30B - 1- 2) in a grave of honour (a grave given to particularly significant citizens).

Kramer's work was soon forgotten. His lyrical yet unromantic poetry draws its power and poetic quality from its depiction of outsiders: members of the proletariat, tramps, craftsmen, servants and whores. Kramer wrote sensitive poetic portraits of people and landscapes. His literary influences were Georg Trakl and Bertolt Brecht. Kramer's oeuvre consists of 10,000 works, many of which remain unpublished.

Thomas Mann called him, "one of the greatest poets of the young generation," and Stefan Zweig and Carl Zuckmayer promoted his writing. Yet the eighteen years of his exile in the United Kingdom were sufficient to allow his work to fall into obscurity, at least amongst the general reading public.

From the end of the 1970s, the interpretations of his poetry by the German folk duo Zupfgeigenhansel contributed significantly to the rediscovery of Kramer. In recent years the Berlin singer Hans-Eckardt Wenzel has released two albums of Kramer's poems set to music, which has revived interest in the poet in the German-speaking world.

In her 1996 book, In der Falle, Nobel Prize-winning author Herta Müller analyzed Kramer's autobiographical poetry in the context of dictatorship.

== Awards ==
- 1958 Literaturpreis der Stadt Wien (a literature prize awarded by the city of Vienna)

The Theodor Kramer Prize of the Theodor Kramer Society is awarded to authors writing in a context of resistance or exile.

== Works ==
This is a list of his works, in German.

- Gesammelte Gedichte in drei Bänden. Erwin Chvojka Ed. 3 vols. Paul Zsolnay Verlag, Vienna 2005. ISBN 3-552-04875-8
- Spätes Lied. Gedichte. Erwin Chvojka Ed. Europaverlag, Munich 1996. ISBN 3-203-79255-9
- Lass still bei Dir mich liegen ... Love poems. Erwin Chvojka Ed. Paul Zsolnay Verlag, Vienna 2005. ISBN 3-552-05358-1
- Der alte Zitherspieler. Portraits. Erwin Chvojka Ed. Club Niederösterreich, Vienna 1999. ISBN 3-85326-117-5
- So lange der Atem uns trägt. Poems. Theodor Kramer-Gesellschaft, Vienna 2004. ISBN 3-901602-19-4
- Herta Müller (Ed.): Die Wahrheit ist, man hat mir nichts getan. Poems. Paul Zsolnay, Vienna 1999. ISBN 3-552-04917-7
