= The Passport (novel) =

Book by Herta Müller

- First edition book cover
- Author: Herta Müller
- Original title: Der Mensch ist ein großer Fasan auf der Welt
- Publisher: Rotbuch Verlag
- Publication date: January 1, 1986
- ISBN: 9783880223141

The Passport (German: Der Mensch ist ein großer Fasan auf der Welt) is a novel by Herta Müller, published in German in 1986. The German title (literally, "Man is a great pheasant in the world") refers to a saying in Romania. The novel, one of several for which the author was known when winning the Nobel in 2009, tells the story of a village miller in a German-speaking village in the Banat in Romania, who applies for permission to emigrate to West Germany. The novel was published in English by Serpent's Tail in 1989, the first of Müller's novels to be offered in direct translation.

== Translations ==
- Müller, Herta (1986) Der Mensch ist ein großer Fasan auf der Welt; Berlin: Carl Hanser Verlag ISBN 978-3-499-13385-5
  - (English) The Passport (September 1989); Translator: Martin Chalmers; London: Serpent's Tail; 96p. ISBN 978-1-85242-139-7
  - (French) L'homme est un grand faisan sur terre (1988); Translator: Nicole Bary; Paris: Maren Sell; 124p. ISBN 978-2-07-038238-5
  - (Serbian) Čovek je veliki fazan na ovom svetu (2011); Translator: Tijana Tropin; Belgrade: Zlatni Zmaj: Laguna; 150p. ISBN 978-86-521-0550-2
  - (Spanish) El hombre es un gran faisán en el mundo (1992); Translator: Juan José del Solar; Madrid: Siruela; 128p. ISBN 978-84-9841-094-5
  - (Swedish) Människan är en stor fasan på jorden: en berättelse (1987); Translator: Karin Löfdahl; Stockholm: Alba ISBN 978-91-7458-828-6
  - (Czech) Cestovní pas (2010); Translator: Radka Denemarková; Prague: Mladá fronta; 112 p. ISBN 978-80-204-2192-0
  - (Malayalam) Passport (2010); Translator: Dr. S. Sreenivasan; India: DC Books; 120p. ISBN 978-81-264-2840-3
  - (Korean) 인간은 이 세상의 거대한 꿩이다 (2010); Translator: 김인순; Korea: Munhakdongne Publishing Corp.; 160p. ISBN 978-89-546-1223-4
  - සිංහල -දඩබිමක සිරගතව (සජීවනි කස්තුරිආරච්චි)
