= Richard Wagner (novelist) =

German-Romanian poet and writer (1952–2023)

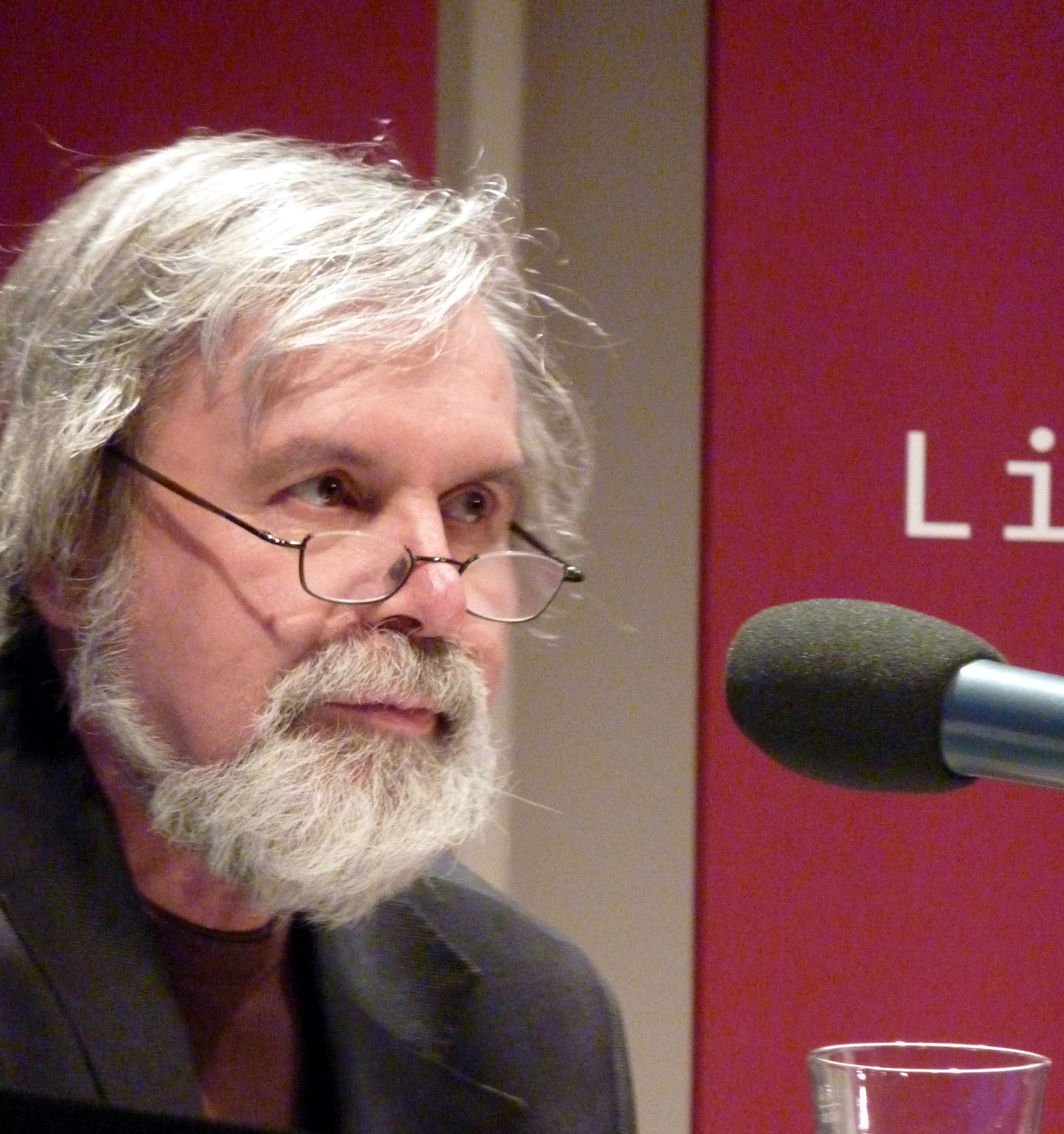
- Wagner in 2010
- Born: 10 April 1952; Lovrin, Romania
- Died: 14 March 2023 (aged 70); Berlin, Germany
- Occupations: Poet, writer, essayist
- Spouse: Herta Müller
- Writing career
- Period: 20th–21st century

Richard Wagner (10 April 1952 – 14 March 2023) was a Romanian-born German poet and writer. He published a number of poetry collections, short stories, novels and essays.

== Life and work ==
Wagner was a member of one of Romania's German minorities, called Banat Swabians, like his wife, Herta Müller. He studied German and Romanian literature at Timișoara University. He then worked as a German language school teacher and as a journalist, and published poetry and short stories in German. He was in 1972 a co-founder and member of the Aktionsgruppe Banat, a German-speaking literary activist society.

In 1987, Wagner and Müller left Romania for West Berlin, to escape communist oppression and censorship in Nicolae Ceaușescu's Romania. They separated in 1989.

Wagner had Parkinson's disease for many years. He died in a Berlin nursing home on 14 March 2023, at age 70.

== Publications (selection) ==
- Klartext. Ein Gedichtbuch (1973)
- die invasion der uhren. Gedichte (1977)
- Der Anfang einer Geschichte. Prosa (1980)
- Hotel California I. Der Tag, der mit einer Wunde begann. Gedichte (1980)
- Anna und die Uhren. Ein Lesebuch für kleine Leute mit Bildern von Cornelia König (1981, 1987)
- Gegenlicht. Gedichte (1983)
- Das Auge des Feuilletons. Geschichten und Notizen. (1984)
- Rostregen. Gedichte. Luchterhand (1986)
- Ausreiseantrag (1988)
- Begrüßungsgeld (1989)
- Die Muren von Wien. Roman. (1990)
- Der Sturz des Tyrannen. Rumänien und das Ende der Diktatur. edited with Helmuth Frauendorfer (1990)
- Sonderweg Rumänien. Bericht aus einem Entwicklungsland. (1991)
- Schwarze Kreide. Gedichte. (1991)
- Völker ohne Signale. Zum Epochenbruch in Osteuropa. Essay (1992)
- Der Himmel von New York im Museum von Amsterdam. Geschichten. (199)
- Heiße Maroni. Gedichte. (1993)
- Giancarlos Koffer (1993)
- Mythendämmerung. Einwürfe eines Mitteleuropäers. (1993)
- Der Mann, der Erdrutsche sammelte. Geschichten. (1994)
- In der Hand der Frauen, novel (1995, DVA) ISBN 3-421-05008-2
- Lisas geheimes Buch, novel (1996)
- Im Grunde sind wir alle Sieger. Roman. (1998)
- Mit Madonna in der Stadt. Gedichte. (2000)
- Miss Bukarest, novel (2001, Aufbau) ISBN 3-351-02926-8
- Ich hatte ein bisschen Kraft drüber, Materialsammlung zu Birgit Vanderbeke von Richard Wagner (2001, S. Fischer TB) ISBN 3-596-14937-1
- Der leere Himmel, Reise in das Innere des Balkan, essay (2003, Aufbau) ISBN 3-351-02548-3
- Habseligkeiten, novel (2004, Aufbau) ISBN 3-351-03027-4
- Der deutsche Horizont. Vom Schicksal eines guten Landes, essay (2006, Aufbau) ISBN 3-351-02628-5
- Das reiche Mädchen, novel (2007, Aufbau) ISBN 3-351-03226-9
- Es reicht. Gegen den Ausverkauf unserer Werte, essay (2008, Aufbau) ISBN 3-351-02673-0
- Linienflug. Gedichte. edited by Ernest Wichner (2010, Hochroth) ISBN 978-3-942161-03-9
- Belüge mich, novel (2011, Aufbau) ISBN 978-3-351-033361
- Die deutsche Seele, with Thea Dorn. (2011, Knaus) ISBN 978-3-8135-0451-4
- Und meine Seele spannte weit ihre Flügel aus. Hundert deutsche Gedichte. edited, postscript by Richard Wagner (Aufbau, 2013) ISBN 978-3-351-03549-5
- Habsburg. Bibliothek einer verlorenen Welt (2014, Hoffmann und Campe) ISBN 978-3-455-50306-7

== Honours ==
- 1987 Spezial prize of the Leonce-und-Lena-Preis
- 1988 Förderpreis of the Andreas-Gryphius-Preis
- 1989 Deutscher Sprachpreis, with Gerhardt Csejka, Helmuth Frauendorfer, Klaus Hensel, Johann Lippet, Herta Müller, Werner Söllner and William Totok
- 1990/91 Scholarship of the Villa Massimo
- 2000 Literature prize of neue deutsche literatur
- 2008 Georg Dehio Book Prize
- 2011 Donauschwäbischer Kulturpreis of Baden-Württemberg, for his life's work
- 2014 Verdienstkreuz am Bande des Verdienstordens der Bundesrepublik Deutschland
