= In der Falle =

Book by Herta Müller

In der Falle: Drei Essays (lit. 'In the Trap: Three Essays') is a book by Nobel Prize-winning author Herta Müller. It was first published in 1996 by Wallstein Verlag. The book consists of essays about the autobiographical poetry of three writers, Theodor Kramer, Ruth Klüger and Inge Müller, who wrote under conditions of dictatorship.

== Release details ==
- — (1996). In der Falle. Bonner Poetik-Vorlesung : Politik, Sprache, Poesie (in German). Wallstein Verlag. ISBN 978-3-89244-235-6.
