= Heimat ist das, was gesprochen wird =

2001 book by Nobel Prize-winning author Herta Müller

Heimat ist das, was gesprochen wird (lit. 'Homeland is what is said') is a book by Nobel Prize-winning author Herta Müller. First published in 2001, the book's title was inspired by Jorge Semprún when he says in Federico Sánchez vous salue bien: "Basically language is not my Heimat, but that which is spoken."

== Release details ==
- —; Schock, R. (2009). Heimat ist das, was gesprochen wird. Rede an die Abiturienten des Jahrgangs (in German). Gollenstein. ISBN 978-3-938823-65-1.
