= The Land of Green Plums =

Novel by Herta Muller

- First edition (German)
- Author: Herta Müller
- Original title: Herztier
- Translator: Michael Hofmann
- Language: German
- Genre: Bildungsroman
- Publisher: Rowohlt (Germany); Metropolitan Books (U.S.)
- Publication date: 1994
- Publication place: Germany
- English publication date: 15 November 1996
- Media type: Print (Hardback and Paperback)
- Pages: 256

The Land of Green Plums (German: Herztier, lit. 'heart animal') is a novel by Herta Müller, published in 1994 by Rowohlt Verlag. The novel portrays four young people living in a totalitarian police state in Communist Romania, ending with their emigration to Germany. The narrator is an unidentified young woman belonging to the ethnic German minority. Müller said the novel was written "in memory of my Romanian friends who were killed under the Ceauşescu regime".

Like many of Müller's books, The Land of Green Plums illustrates the position of dissidents from the German minority in Romania, who suffered a double oppression under the regime of Nicolae Ceauşescu. The rural German-speaking community tries to preserve its culture by enforcing traditional rules; once the main characters escape this environment through university study in the city, they suffer, as political dissidents, the oppression exercised by the totalitarian regime. Those who flee the country for Germany become cultural outcasts: they are not considered German there but rather Eastern Europeans. Critics read the novel as testifying to abuse and the ensuing trauma. Normal human relationships are rendered impossible by the lack of freedom of expression; the threat of violence, imprisonment, and execution; and the possibility that any personal friend may be a traitor. Written in a paratactic style, full of flashbacks and time shifts, the language of the book reflects trauma and political oppression.

After its publication in German and its translation into Dutch, the novel received moderate attention. It gained an international audience when the English translation by Michael Hofmann was published in 1996. In 1998 this translation won the International Dublin Literary Award, the largest prize given for a single work of fiction published in English. Following the announcement that Müller was awarded the 2009 Nobel Prize in Literature, The Land of Green Plums entered the bestseller list on Amazon.

== Plot ==
The first character introduced to the reader is a girl named Lola, who shares a college dormitory room with five other girls, including the narrator. Lola records her experiences in a diary, relating her efforts to escape from the totalitarian world of school and society. She rides the buses at night and has brutish, anonymous sex with men returning home from factory work. She also has an affair with the gym teacher, and soon joins the Communist Party. This first part of the book ends when Lola is found dead, hanging in the closet; she has left her diary in the narrator's suitcase.

Having supposedly died by suicide and thus betrayed her country and her party, Lola is publicly denounced in a school ceremony. Soon after, the narrator shares Lola's diary with three male friends, Edgar, Georg, and Kurt; Lola's life becomes an escape for them as they attend college and engage in mildly subversive activities—"harbouring unsuitable German books, humming scraps of banned songs, writing to one another in crude code, taking photographs of the blacked-out buses which carry prisoners between the prison and the construction sites." The four are from German-speaking communities; all receive mail from their mothers complaining about their various illnesses and how their children's subversiveness is causing them trouble; all have fathers who had been members of the Nazi SS in Romania during World War II. They hide the diary and other documents, including photographs and books, in the well of a deserted summerhouse in town. Very quickly it becomes clear that an officer of the Securitate, Captain Pjele, is interested in the four; he begins to subject them to regular interrogations. Their possessions are searched, their mail opened, and they are threatened by the captain and his dog.

After graduation the four go their separate ways, but they remain in contact through letters and regular visits, although their letters are read by the Securitate. They take menial jobs: Kurt works in a slaughterhouse as a supervisor, for instance; and the narrator translates German manuals in a factory. A fifth member, Tereza, befriends the narrator even as it becomes clear that she is acting partly on Pjele's orders.

The lives of all five become more miserable, and each conforms to the regime's demands even as they lose their jobs for apparently political reasons. They discuss fleeing the country, and Georg is the first to do so. Weeks after he arrives in Germany, he is found dead from a fall from the window of a Frankfurt hotel. The narrator and Edgar likewise acquire passports and go to Germany, but continue to receive death threats after emigrating. Kurt remains in Romania, no longer working; he is later found hanged. The novel ends with the same passage as it began: "When we don't speak, said Edgar, we become unbearable, and when we do, we make fools of ourselves".

== Characters ==
The narrator, Edgar, Georg, and Kurt hail from similar backgrounds. All are German Romanian and students at the same university. They all suffer persecution, and oppose the regime. The characters—especially Edgar, Georg, and Kurt—are quite deliberately not developed in great detail, as noted by critics. "Characterization is not the point here. Müller is primarily a poet", and this poetic interest likewise is said to explain the lack of chapter organization and of transitional phrases. Only two of the six main characters who suffer oppression survive at the end of the book: Lola dies by hanging, Georg commits suicide after fleeing to Germany, Kurt is found hanged, and Tereza, the narrator's friend who betrays her to the Securitate, dies of cancer.

== Genre ==
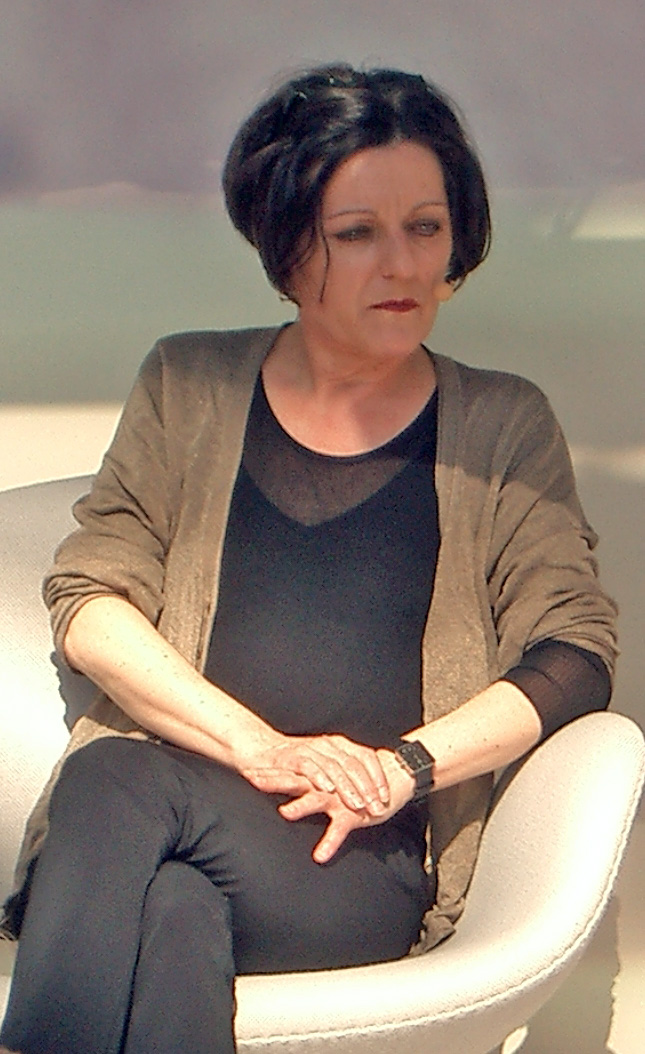
Herta Müller, 2007

=== Autobiography ===
The novel is partly autobiographical. Like her narrator, Müller comes from the German-speaking minority in Romania, the Banat Swabians, with a father who had been former SS man during World War II. Trained as a teacher, she lost her position after refusing to cooperate with the Securitate. She emigrated to Germany in 1987. In a 1998 interview she mentioned that real persons can be recognized in some of her characters, including one in The Land of Green Plums: "That [recognition of characters] was already the case in my previous book [The Land of the Green Plums]. Because my best girlfriend died young, and because she had betrayed me, and because I had to despise her and could not stop loving her."

In an earlier interview with the Danish newspaper Politiken, Müller went into greater detail about her friend, portrayed as Tereza in this novel:

I had a good friend in Romania, who came and visited me in Germany, when I had finally escaped from the country. She was in the service of the Securitate, as it turned out. She had left her passport lying out, and I saw it by chance one morning, when she was out. No ordinary person had such a passport with visas to Greece, to Italy, and Spain. She confessed everything, and shortly after I naturally had to throw her out. This happened in the same period that I was receiving death threats like many others who had fled from Romania, and I kept far away from Romanians I did not know or could not count on. But she was my friend.

=== Allegory ===
The novel approaches allegory in many of its details, such as the green plums of the title. Mothers warn their children not to eat green, unripe plums, claiming that they are poisonous. Yet the novel regularly depicts police officers gorging themselves on the fruit: "The officers' lack of constraint in engulfing the fruit parallels the remorseless persecution of the human race" under Nicolae Ceauşescu. The green plums also suggest childhood, or regression into childhood: "The narrator watches the Romanian police guards in the streets of the city as they greedily pocket green plums ... 'They reverted to childhood, stealing plums from village trees.' Ms. Muller's vision of a police state manned by plum thieves reads like a kind of fairy tale on the mingled evils of gluttony, stupidity and brutality."

== Language and style ==
Critics have recognized Müller's writing as political, "as a form of manifest resistance against totalitarian claims to power," and have studied her "complex and ambiguous imagery." According to Larry Wolff, reviewing the book for The New York Times, the poetic quality of the language is essentially connected to its author's objective: "the author seeks to create a sort of poetry out of the spiritual and material ugliness of life in Communist Romania." Critics have generally shown appreciation for the novel's language, as did Nicholas Lezard, writing in The Guardian:

The prose, while simple at the level of the sentence (and we can safely assume that Hofmann's translation is very faithful to the original), is shifty, blurred, to the point where at times we are left unsure as to what exactly is going on – a deliberate flight from causation, quite understandable in a country where everyone (even, we learn, the horses) has been driven mad by fear.

Though the novel's language, and Müller's language in general, is praised for its precision--Peter Englund, secretary of the Swedish Academy, noted her "extreme precision with words"—many things are left unsaid. As a reviewer for The Australian noted, the narrator is never named, the words "totalitarian" and "liberty" never appear in the book, and even Ceausescu, usually referred to as the "dictator," is named only twice, first when one of the characters (a Jewish WWII survivor) notes how the greeting "ciao" is also the first syllable of the dictator's name, and again when a comparison is made between Ceausescu, Hitler, and Stalin.

== Themes ==
=== Trauma ===
Psychological trauma caused by fear permeates the novel: "Fear, isolation, and abandonment characterize the lives of the first-person narrator and her three friends....Müller describes how fear acquires a life of its own; it becomes independent of the subject's will." One critic argues that "Herztier was written in response to the trauma of life under the Ceauşescu dictatorship, when the citizens of Romania lived in constant fear of the secret police or Securitate." As Müller said in an interview, this fear in the novel is autobiographical as well.

According to Beverley Driver Eddy, The Land of Green Plums presents trauma as well as its testimony; the narrator gives her own testimony, and relates it to the testimony of her friends' suffering. The first of these is Lola, the friend who supposedly kills herself; her testimony is preserved in her diary, in which she wrote of her animalistic sexual exploits with nameless men and her struggle to cope with the guilt of having joined the Communist Party in an effort to better herself. For the narrator, preserving Lola's notebook (and sharing it with her three friends) becomes of paramount importance, especially since the memory of Lola was erased days after her death by the Party establishment. Additional complexity comes from Lola's testimony being interwoven in the narrator's own—"a testimony within a testimony." In an interview published in 1998, Müller said that "she is concerned with showing that the childhood experiences have been internalised by the narrator, and that the traumas of the frightened, non-conformist child are replicated to the larger traumas of the adult dissident." In the image of the weeds cut down by the narrator's father, an image presented early in the novel, the parallel between the father and the dictator is evidenced: "both 'make cemeteries' without fear of retribution." One symptom of the trauma this causes in its victims is disconnection, the strain of friendship resulting from lack of trust, disrupting normal human relationships for the remainder of the victim's life. Müller's novel portrays this disconnection and the ongoing trauma for survivors, even after the fall of the dictatorship.

Other critics have focused on different effects of trauma in the novel and in Müller's work in general. Lyn Marven argues that the Müller's poetics and style, characterized by paratactic as well as syntactic and narrative gaps, illustrates one of the effects of trauma:

"Trauma disrupts the structures of memory....Trauma cannot be integrated into narrative memory and exists only as a gap or blank spot; it therefore cannot be articulated, and returns in the form of surprisingly literal flashbacks, hallucinations, or dreams."

Marven notes another effect: a "distorted body image" that often gives rise to a "radical metonymy," a fragmentation, surfacing most notably in a scene where Pjele, during an interrogation, lists the narrator's clothes and possessions, to which the narrator responds by listing her own body parts: "1 pr. eyes, 1 pr. ears, 1 nose, 1 pr. lips, 1 neck." Marven notes that Müller's collages, which the critic says are "central to Müller's œuvre," show the same fragmentation, and says that her "increasingly readable" prose, coupled with recent collages moving toward narrative, might suggest that there is "a possibility of overcoming trauma."(Grazziella Predoui also noted that Müller's prose is developing from parataxis toward more complicated syntax.)

=== Banat-Swabians ===
The situation of the Banat-Swabians, the German-speaking minority in Romania, is a recurring theme in Müller's writing. Historically, Germans were recruited by the Austria-Hungary to repopulate southern areas following the expulsion of the Turks of the Ottoman Empire. They were given special privileges, allowed to keep their language and Roman Catholicism, even in areas in which the Orthodox Church was paramount. Their communities spoke German into the 20th century. They were among ethnic Germans, or Volksdeutsche, whom Adolf Hitler proposed to unite in a greater Germany. Millions of ethnic Germans were expelled from eastern Europe after the war; thousands were forced into labor camps. Even years later, they were often discriminated against in Romania under the communist government.

By the late 20th century, their status is one of the central themes of The Land of Green Plums; this idea is explored in detail in Valentina Glajar's 1997 article "Banat-Swabian, Romanian, and German: Conflicting Identities in Herta Müller's Herztier." The Banat-Swabian community, of which the narrator is a member, was described by Müller as extremely ethnocentric. Following persecution after the war, while remaining survivors had no desire to emigrate to Germany, they exerted an almost totalitarian control, especially on their children to keep them within their community. Müller had already addressed this topic in her first work, Niederungen, translated as Nadirs in English, in which the German community holds on to its language and habits in an attempt to deny the Romanian dictatorship that rules them. One critic characterized this communal attempt in Niederungen as a "mechanistically followed tradition".

According to Glajar, this is the world of the narrator's mother, who writes of her sicknesses in her letters in the hope of keeping her daughter emotionally connected to her home village. The narrator's father was a member of the SS (as were Müller's father and uncle), and is a troubling example of Germanness. The novel proposes a tension inside Romania between the culturally totalitarian atmosphere of the Banat-Swabian community and the politically totalitarian world of Timișoara, where the main characters attend college—between German and Romanian. But the main characters who move to Germany quickly discover that although they were German in Romania, they are Romanian in Germany. They face new social, cultural and linguistic difficulties. Georg commits suicide a few weeks after his arrival in Frankfurt.

== Critical reception ==
=== Academic interest ===
The book attracted academic interest, and scholars discussed it in at least three distinct categories: language and style, often in relation to the politics of totalitarianism; trauma studies, given the psychological pressure on the novel's characters, who grow up under a totalitarian regime; and ethnographic and literary studies of the German minority in Romania. On the latter topic, Valentina Glajar, now at Texas State University, published an article in 1997. Müller's Herztier is one of the four titles discussed in Glajar's 2004 monograph The German Legacy, on German-language literature from Eastern Europe.

=== Attention in the press ===
In the German press, the novel's publication generated modest but positive attention. Rolf Michaelis reviewed the novel at length in Die Zeit in October 1994, analyzing the function of fear and praising the book as a "poetic epic", comparing transitions and structure to those found in Homer. "Herta Müller", he wrote, "does not simply use the German language; she makes it her own, in an incomparable way. She invents her own language." A favorable review of the Dutch translation appeared in the national daily newspaper Trouw in 1996.

The English translation was likewise favorably reviewed: a review in The San Diego Union-Tribune said "this heartbreaking tale is bitter and dark, yet beautiful". Larry Wolff, in his review for The New York Times, described the book as "a novel of graphically observed detail in which the author seeks to create a sort of poetry out of the spiritual and material ugliness of life in Communist Romania".

Radio Free Europe reported that the novel is a favorite of Mohammad-Ali Abtahi, the Iranian pro-democracy activist, who read it (in the Persian translation by Gholamhossein Mirza-Saleh) shortly after being released from prison in 2009.

== Awards ==
=== International Dublin Literary Award ===
- The novel and its English translation won the 1998 International Dublin Literary Award; Müller received £75,000, and translator Michael Hofmann £25,000. In its comments, the jury remarked on the main themes of the novel—politics, language, and allegory, saying:

The novel brilliantly evokes a world of cruelty and oppression. Set in Communist Romania under the Ceaucescu dictatorship, The Land of Green Plums portrays the lives of a group of dissident students and teachers whose integrity is continuously assailed and sometimes betrayed. Herta Müller's stark and vivid prose explores a terror-stricken society of mendacity and political slander. The "green plums" of the title stand in part for truth and its brutal suppression in a world of interrogators and informers, where speaking out can become a matter of life and death.

The author's style, achieves a spartan eloquence, and the novel's individual characters are powerfully drawn.

This elegantly understated book is at once bleak and beautiful, humorous and heartbreaking.

The International Dublin Literary Award drew attention to the novel, and by the end of the year, it had been published in paperback in the US by Hydra Books/Northwestern University Press.

=== 2009 Nobel Prize in Literature ===
In 2009, Herta Müller won the Nobel Prize in Literature. During the presentation ceremony, Anders Olsson, member of the Swedish Academy, referred to The Land of Green Plums as "a masterful account of the flight of a group of youths from the terror regime". Immediately following the announcement, sales of this and Müller's other novels (five had been translated into English by then) skyrocketed: "On Thursday morning, when the award was announced, The Land of Green Plums, by all accounts Müller's best book, was No. 56,359 on Amazon.com; by the close of business that day, it was No. 7".

== Publication history ==
The Land of Green Plums is the second novel published by Müller since leaving Romania, after Der Fuchs war damals schon der Jäger (1992). It appeared in German in 1994, followed by the English translation in 1996. The hardback was published in the United States by Metropolitan Books in November 1996. A Dutch translation was published in 1996. Although French-language Swiss media had shown interest in the author, the novel had not been translated into French by 1998 After the IMPAC award, paperback editions of Hoffman's translation were published in the United Kingdom by Granta later that year and again in September 1999 (with new cover art). It was published in the United States by Northwestern University Press in November 1998. In November 2010, after Müller had won the Nobel Prize for Literature, a paperback was released in the United Kingdom and the United States by Picador.
