= Nadirs (autobiography) =

1982 book by Herta Müller

- 1982 Kriterion (Bucharest) edition
- Author: Herta Müller
- Original title: Niederungen
- Translator: Sieglinde Lug
- Language: German
- Genre: Short story, autobiography
- Publisher: University of Nebraska Press (US)
- Publication date: 1982
- Publication place: Romania
- English publication date: 1999
- Media type: Print (hardback & paperback)
- Pages: 118 p. (paperback edition)
- ISBN: 978-0-8032-8254-4 (paperback edition)

Nadirs (German: Niederungen) is a collection of largely autobiographical short stories by Romanian-German writer and Nobel laureate Herta Müller. The stories center on life in the Romanian countryside.

The book was first released in Romania in 1982, where it received a prize awarded by the Central Committee of the Union of Communist Youth. A supposedly uncensored version, missing four chapters of the Romanian version, was smuggled to Germany and released in 1984.

== Stories ==
- The Funeral Sermon
- The Swabian Bath
- My Family
- Nadirs
- Rotten Pears
- Oppressive Tango
- The Window
- The Man with the Matchbox
- Village Chronicle
- About German Mustaches and Hair Parts
- The Intervillage Bus
- Mother, Father, and the Little One
- The Street Sweepers
- Black Park
- Workday
