= Barfüßiger Februar =

Book by Herta Müller

- Front cover
- Author: Herta Müller
- Language: German
- Publisher: Rotbuch Verlag
- Publication date: 1987
- Publication place: Germany
- Media type: Print (softcover)
- ISBN: 978-3-88022-024-9
- OCLC: 263149620

Barfüßiger Februar ("Barefoot February") is a book by Nobel Prize-winning author Herta Müller. It was first published in 1987. The book consists of a series of short stories, each indicting conditions present in German speaking part of Romania, such as the wretched poverty seen in the Romanian countryside. An article in Die Zeit by Marina Münkler calls it a "Dokument der Zerrissenheit".
