= Gerhardt Csejka =

German essayist and literary translator

- Born: 11 April 1945; Zăbrani, Kingdom of Romania
- Died: 25 November 2022 (aged 77); Berlin, Germany

Gerhardt Csejka (11 April 1945 – 25 November 2022) was a German essayist and literary translator.

He had delivered lectures at the Johann Wolfgang Goethe-Universität Frankfurt am Main (1990-1992) and the Johannes Gutenberg-Universität Mainz (1993-2003).

He had been granted several important prizes.
