= Zăbrani =

- Commune
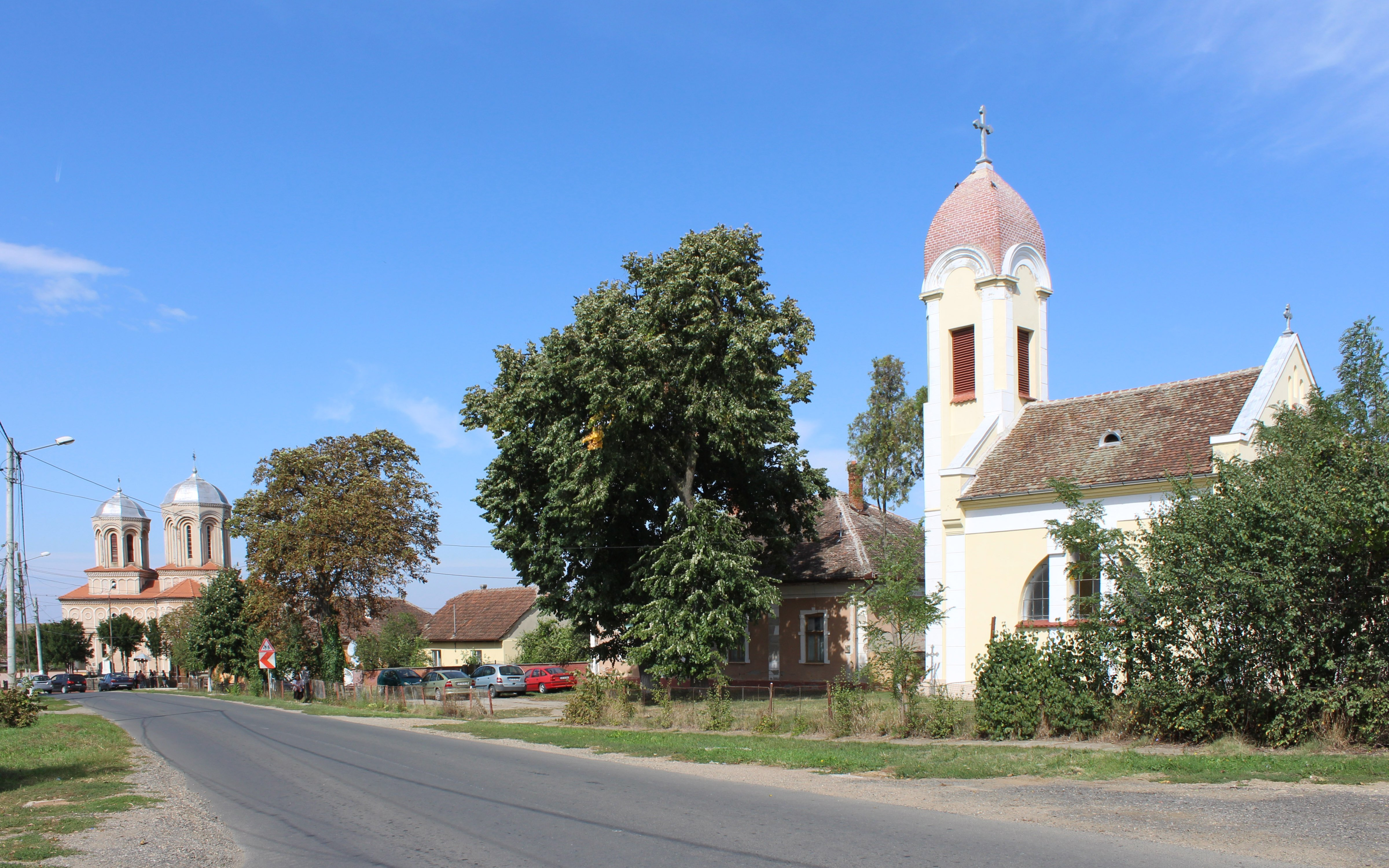
- Zăbrani

- Location in Arad County

- Location in Romania
- Coordinates: 46°4′N 21°33′E
- Country: Romania
- County: Arad

Government
  - Mayor (2021–2024): Dănuț Codrean
- Area: 117.78 km^{2} (45.48 sq mi)
- Elevation: 146 m (479 ft)
- Population (2021-12-01): 3,661
  - Density: 31.08/km^{2} (80.51/sq mi)
- Time zone: UTC+02:00 (EET)
  - Summer (DST): UTC+03:00 (EEST)
- Vehicle reg.: AR

Zăbrani (German: Guttenbrunn; Hungarian: Temeshidegkút) is a commune in Arad County, Romania. It is situated in the eastern part of the Vinga Plateau, in its contact zone with the Lipova Hills. Its administrative territory stretches over 11,778 hectares. It is composed of three villages: Chesinț (Lippakeszi), Neudorf (Temesújfalu) and Zăbrani (situated at 29 km from Arad).

== Population ==
According to the last census the population of the commune counts 4472 inhabitants, out of which 95.6% are Romanians, 1.7% Hungarians, 1.2% Germans, 1.3% Ukrainians and 0.2% are of other or undeclared nationalities.

== History ==
In the archaeological site of Zăbrani two settlements from the palaeolithic period, respectively from the Iron Age. The first documentary record of Zăbrani dates back to 1080–1090. Chesinț was attested documentarily in 1334, while Neudorf in 1723.

== Economy ==
Although the economy of the commune is mainly of agrarian type, based on livestock-breeding and olericulture, light industry and small industry are also well represented in its economic spectrum.

== Tourism ==
Zăbrani commune has been included in the category of territorial administrative units with high concentrate of valuable built patrimony. Among the touristic sights of the commune are the rural architectural complex in Zăbrani dating from the 9th century, the Roman Catholic church in the centre of Neudorf village (1771), the crypt of Archduchess Maria Anna of Austria in Neudorf (1809) with a funeral monument raised in 1841, as well as the memorial museum of Adam Müller-Guttenbrunn.

== Notable people ==
- Adam Müller-Guttenbrunn, writer
- Gerhardt Csejka, translator
- Ernest Wichner, translator
