= Drückender Tango =

1984 collection of short stories by Herta Müller

First edition

Drückender Tango (Oppressive Tango) is a collection of short stories by Nobel Prize-winning author Herta Müller. It was Müller's second book, published in 1984 in Bucharest. After its publication, Müller was no longer allowed to publish her work in Romania and she moved to Germany. Reviews in Germany had been positive for Drückender Tango, by contrast with the criticism it received in the Romanian press. Today, it has been described as one of Muller's best-known books.

The stories are mainly about the harshness of life in a small village in the Socialist Republic of Romania, which was still under the control of Nicolae Ceaușescu at the time they were written. Urban life is also featured. The name of the collection may be in reference to Romanian-born German poet Paul Celan's Todesfuge (1948), which was translated as Tangoul mortii (Death Tango) in Romania.
