= The Appointment (novel) =

Novel by Herta Müller

- First edition book cover
- Author: Herta Müller
- Publisher: Rowohlt Verlag
- Publication date: January 1, 1997
- Pages: 239
- ISBN: 9783498043896

The Appointment (German: Heute wär ich mir lieber nicht begegnet, lit. 'I would have rather not met myself today') is a novel by German author Herta Müller. The novel was originally published in German in 1997 and later in English by Metropolitan Books and Picador, a Macmillan imprint, in 2001. The novel was one of several for which Müller was known when she received the Nobel Prize in Literature in 2009. The Appointment portrays the humiliations of Communist Romania, told from the perspective of a young woman working as a clothing-factory worker who has been summoned by the secret police. She is accused of sewing notes into the linings of men's suits bound for Italy asking that the recipient marry her to help her get out of the country.

== Sources ==
- "The Evil of Banality" - A review of The Appointment by Costica Bradatan, The Globe and Mail, February 2010
