= Der Fuchs war damals schon der Jäger =

Book by Herta Müller

First edition

Der Fuchs war damals schon der Jäger ("The Fox Was Ever the Hunter") is a book by Nobel Prize-winning author Herta Müller. Der Fuchs war damals schon der Jäger is a novelization of the script for the film Der Fuchs der Jäger, which was produced alongside of Harry Merkel. Der Fuchs war damals schon der Jäger was first published in 1992 and is read as if it were a film, because Herta Müller wholly retains its cinematic character in the piece. Happel called the book "emotionless" and "objective".

On the publication by Portobello of an English translation by Philip Boem in 2016, the book was reviewed by Charlotte Ryland in the Times Literary Supplement. She judged "The force of the author's language and the skill of her translator ensure that the text remains as potent as ever...The result is a powerfully unsettling novel, which renders palpable the cruelty of life under the [Ceauşescu] régime, as well as the brittle exhilarations of its overthrow".
