= The Hunger Angel =

2009 novel by Herta Müller

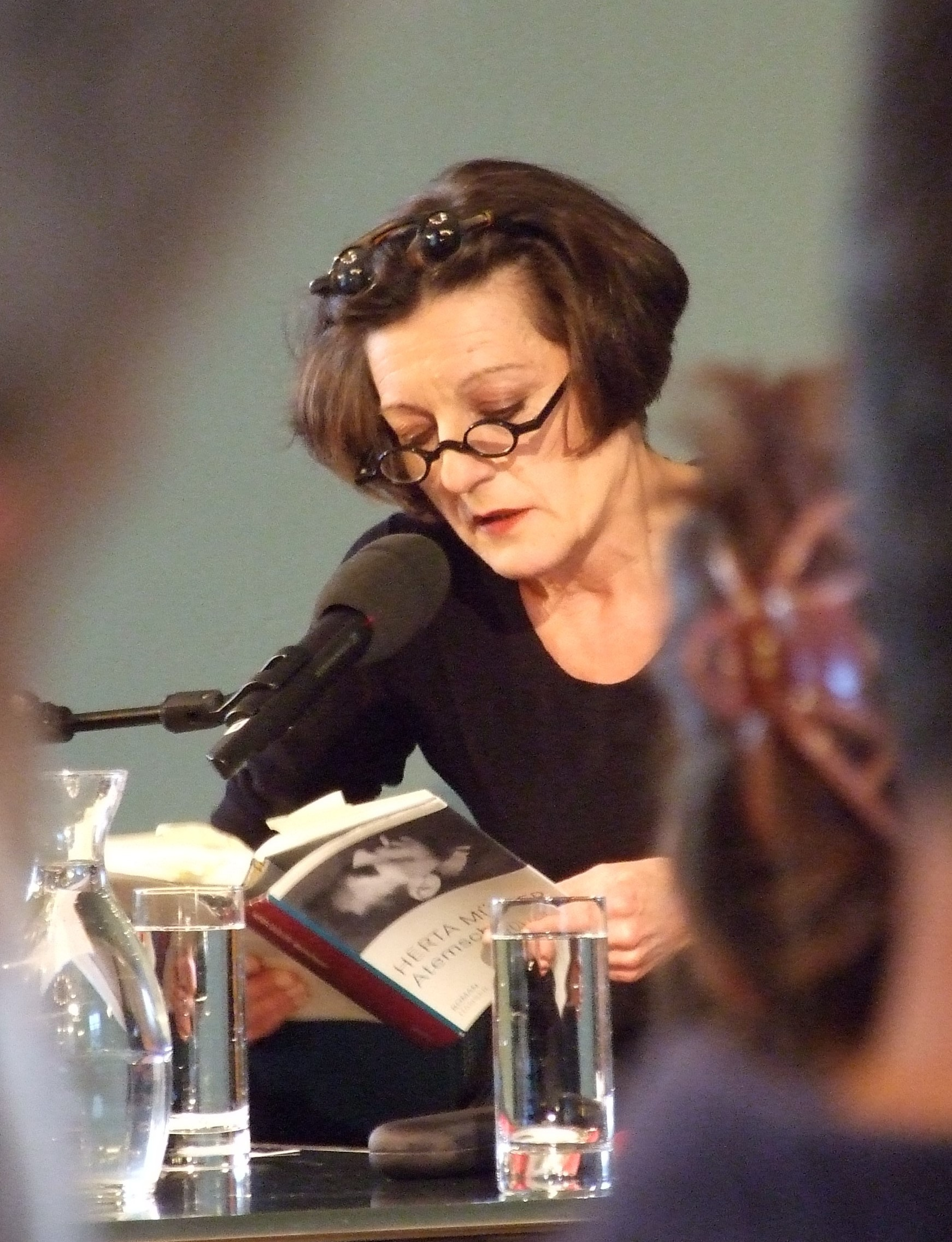
- Herta Müller reading from The Hunger Angel in Frankfurt am Main, 2009.
- Author: Herta Müller
- Original title: Atemschaukel
- Language: German
- Publication date: 2009
- Publication place: Germany

The Hunger Angel (German: Atemschaukel; 2009) is a novel by Herta Müller. An English translation by Philip Boehm was published in 2012.

== Summary ==
It is a depiction of the persecution of ethnic Germans in Romania by the Stalinist regime of the Soviet Union, and deals with the deportation of Romanian Germans to the Soviet Union for forced labour by Soviet occupying forces during and after 1945. The novel tells the story of a youth from Sibiu in Transylvania, Leo Auberg, who is deported at the age of 17 to a Soviet forced labor concentration camp in Nowo-Gorlowka (Novogorlovka, Ukraine, now incorporated in Gorlovka) and spends five years of his life there.

It is inspired by the experiences of poet Oskar Pastior and other survivors, including the mother of the author. Initially, Pastior and Müller had planned to write a book about his experiences together, however, Pastior died in 2006. It is based on her interviews with many deportees from her home village of Nițchidorf in Romania; from fragments offered during her childhood by her mother; and extensively from her interactions with the poet Oskar Pastior who was a deportee from Sibiu (Hermannstadt) Romania for five years.

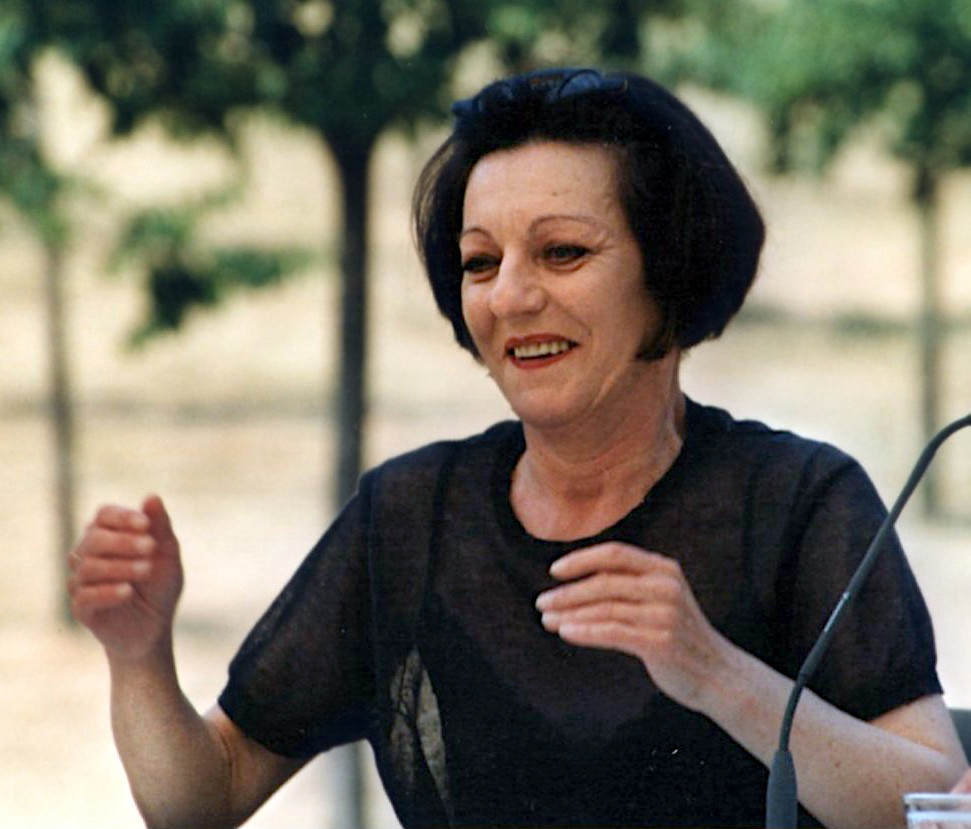
Reading "Atemschaukel", Potsdam, July 2010

The title comes from a compound word "Hungerengel" coined by Pastior to describe the pervasive hunger that dominated his prison experience in the Donets Basin as war reparations slave labor. The fierce hunger was also an angel that kept him alive during the ordeal. The German title, Atemschaukel, is another compound word that is more difficult to translate, meaning something like "BreathingSwing" or "BreathSwinging", to denote the mechanical and distanced aspects of self-awareness of breathing that the prison experience engendered.

According to Ruth Klueger this book offers a new direction in German literature, that of fiction by a second hand participant in the camps, whether Gulag or Internment or Concentration or Extermination.

== Translation ==
Translation rights have been sold in several countries including Poland and Sweden. The working title of "Everything I Possess I Carry With Me", based on the first sentence of the book, was suggested by the German publisher when it sold translation rights, however no English-language translation was published under this title.

== Awards and honors ==
The novel was nominated for the prestigious German Book Prize in 2009, and the author received the Nobel Prize in Literature the same year.

The English translation by Philip Boehm was nominated for the Best Translated Book Award (2013), and won the Oxford-Weidenfeld Translation Prize (2013).

== Editions ==
- The Hunger Angel, Philip Boehm (Translator), Metropolitan Books, April 24, 2012, ISBN 978-0805093018
