= Adam Müller-Guttenbrunn =

Austrian author (1852–1923)

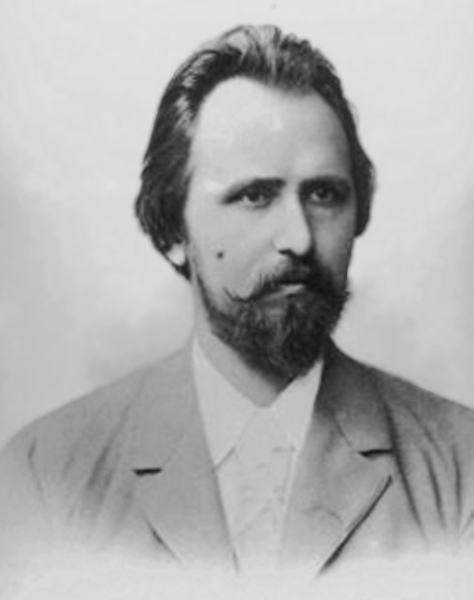
Adam Müller-Guttenbrunn

Adam Müller-Guttenbrunn (22 October 1852, in Guttenbrunn, Austria, today Zăbrani, Romania – 5 January 1923, in Vienna) was an Austrian author.

== Biography ==
He was educated at Hermannstadt (today Sibiu, in Romania) and Vienna. In 1879, he moved to Vienna from Linz. His first success was Des Hauses Fourchambault Ende (1880), supplementing Émile Augier's drama Les Fourchambault. This was followed by Im Banne der Pflicht (1882), the comedy Schauspielerei (with Heinrich Laube, 1883), and Irma (1885). Among his novels and stories, which for the greater part appeared serially, the best-known are: Frau Dornröschen (1884; 3d ed. 1891); Gescheiterte Liebe (1889); and Die Magyarin (1896).
