= Kumm =

Romanian alternative rock band

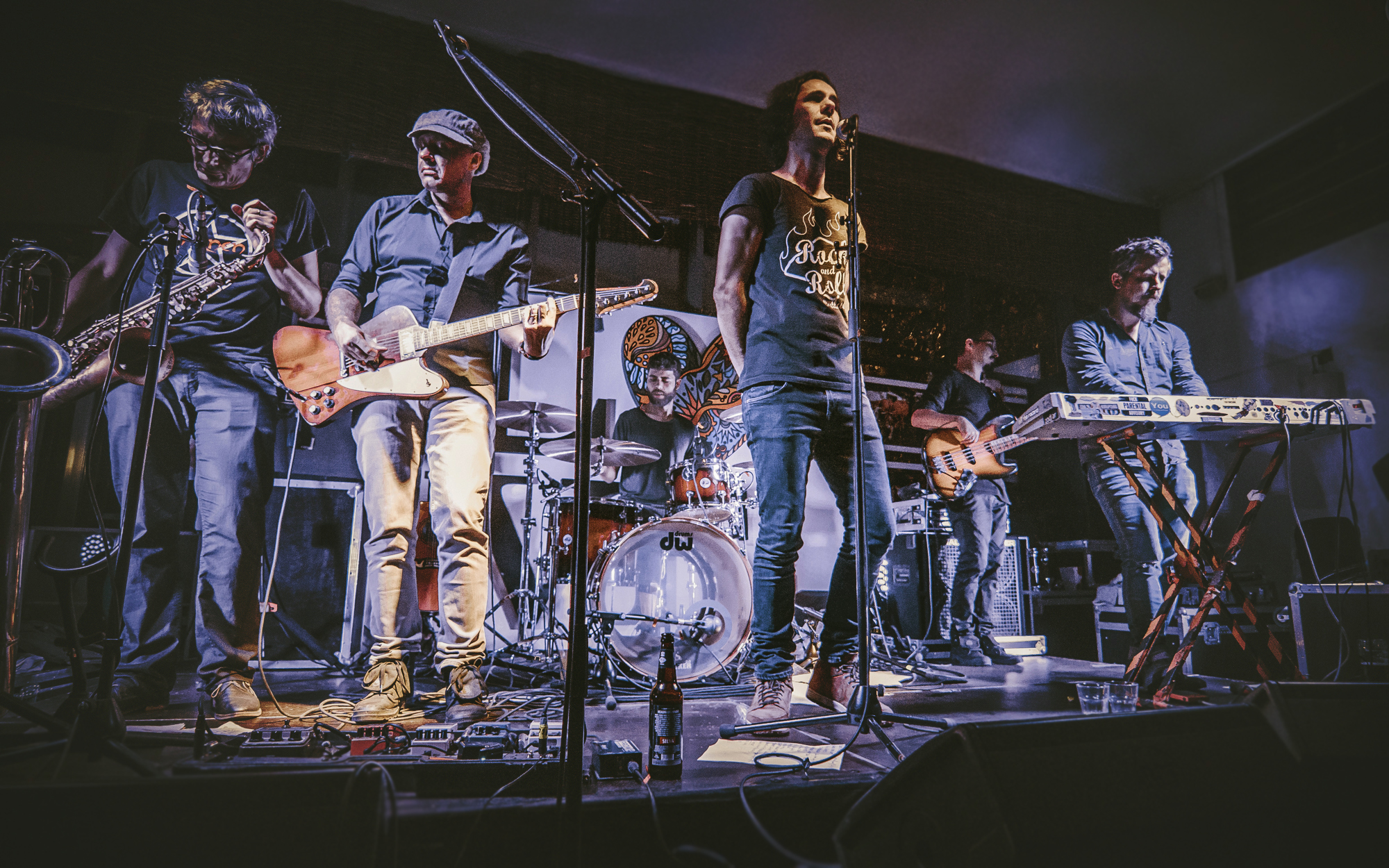
- Kumm during a live performance, October 2017. Left from right: Mihai Iordache, Oigăn, John Ciurea, Cătălin Mocan, Dan Georgescu, Kovács András.

Background information
- Origin: Cluj-Napoca, Cluj County, Romania
- Genres: Alternative rock, progressive rock, indie rock
- Years active: 1997–present
- Labels: Fiver House Records Romania (current); Cramps/Macondo; Soft Records
- Members: Cătălin Mocan; Kovács András; Mihai Iordache; Mihnea Ferezan; Ionuț Deliu; Casian Vlad
- Past members: Meier Zsolt; Pap Joco; Peto Zoltan; Keresztes Levente; Dan „Byron” Radu; Csergö Dominic; Sorin Erhan; Paul Ballo; Alexandru Miu; Uțu Pascu; Eugen „Oigăn” Nuțescu; Dan Georgescu; John Ciurea
- Website: Wix.com/kummmusic

Kumm is a Romanian alternative rock band formed in Cluj-Napoca, Cluj County, Romania in 1997. The band has experienced several line-up changes, with keyboardist Kovács András being the only remaining member from the first line-up. Their style has varied greatly over the passing of time, ranging from progressive rock with jazz and ethno influences to alternative rock and indie rock (most notably after the release of their fourth studio album released in 2006, more specifically Different Parties).

In addition to their native Romania, Kumm toured in countries like Italy, Germany, Czech Republic, and Hungary. They were also included in the line-up of several European festivals, such as Pepsi Sziget (in 2002 and 2008), Sárvár, 4+4 Days In Motion and Peninsula. As of February 2014, Kumm released six studio albums and eight videos.

== History ==
=== Formation and early years (1997–1999) ===
Kumm were formed by guitarist Eugen Nuțescu (also known as Oigăn) and keyboardist Kovács András, after the disbanding of their former musical projects, Short Cuts and Talitha Qumi. Kovács wanted to form a new band, which was supposed to be, musically speaking, a fusion between jazz, rock and ethno and asked Oigăn if he was interested to be part of his project. Shortly after, they were joined by saxophonist Meier Zsolt (a former member of Short Cuts), drummer Pap Joco, and a girl named Cilu who sang lead vocals. Their first demo was recorded in December 1997. Some of the songs from this release (such as "Listen to My Songs" and "Dancing On the Wires") were to reappear later on their debut album, while a re-recorded version of the song "Red Coffee" was included on their third studio album, Angels & Clowns. After the recording of the demo, Cilu decided to quit the band.

In February 1998, the band was invited to play in a club from Cluj, called Music Pub. At that time, the band did not have a name, so the members were forced to come up with something. They chose the name Kumm, which is based on a wordplay ("kumm" means "sand" in Tatar, and its phonetic pronunciation means "how" in Romanian). Their first notable concerts took place in Cluj and Timișoara (at StudentFest). In September the band managed to release a demo, consisting on seven songs, which was entitled Listen to My Songs (Don't Listen to My Words). On 4 January 1999, the band was invited to play for the first time in Bucharest, at Lăptăria lui Enache.

In March same year, after their second concert in Lăptăria lui Enache, the band met Ernesto (Mr. Scarecrow) Bianchi, who later became their manager. Afterwards, Kumm were invited to play in Hungary at an alternative rock festival at Sárvár; they also underwent their first lineup changes: in April, Pap Joco returned to his hometown, Sfântu Gheorghe, while Meier Zsolt joined the musical project of Harry Tavitian, called Orient Express. They were replaced on a temporary basis by drummer Csergö Dominic (Domi) and saxophonist Petö Zoltán (Zoli); shortly after, Domi replaced Joco definitively.

Towards the end of the year, the band started the negotiations with music label Soft Records in order to prepare for recording the debut album.

=== Moonsweat March (2000–2002) ===
In February 2000, Kumm spent three weeks in the studio Glas Transilvan from Cluj to record their first album, entitled Moonsweat March. The album featured ten songs and a bonus track, called "Ce și cum" (Romanian for "What and how"), which was their only song with Romanian lyrics. After finishing the recording phase, saxophonist Meier Zsolt left the band and was replaced by Petö Zoltán. During the recording, Oigăn played guitar as well as bass guitar, but, as this was impossible during live shows, Kumm were soon joined by bassist Keresztes Levente.

Moonsweat March was officially released in April 2000. It received the prize for the best debut album of the year 2000 from Musical Report magazine and was nominated at the category "Best Alternative Album" at the Romanian Music Awards (Premiile industriei muzicale românești). During the summer, the band was invited to play at several festivals (including Sárvár, Hungary). The fall of 2000 brought them an invitation to Posada Rock Festival and the release of their first video, "Ce și cum", which was filmed by TVR2.

In March 2001, Kumm composed a second song in Romanian, which was later featured on a compilation (released in June same year), that contained several tracks of other alternative rock Romanian bands, such as Nightlosers, Luna Amară or Implant Pentru Refuz. The song, which was recorded at the same time with a new version of "Marty", the fourth track from their album, was called "Șapte seri" (Romanian for "Seven Evenings"). The band also released a video for the song, which later peaked at number ten in the MCM Romania chart.

During that year, Kovács and Oigăn played a few concerts with Dan Byron under the name Naked Lunch, covering songs by Led Zeppelin, Björk and Kumm. Kovács also composed and played live the music for a play entitled "Ithaca Dream". In September, the whole band appeared on stage with the actress Ramona Dumitrean in a spectacle-concert called "Apocalipsa dupa Martha" ("Apocalypse after Martha"), produced by The French Cultural Centre from Cluj. In November, Byron joined Kumm, replacing Oigăn as lead singer. His first appearance on stage with Kumm was at a gig in December. Byron and Oigăn spent some time composing the music for the short movie "After leaving", directed by C. Cârcu. After that, the band entered the studio in February 2002 to record the second studio album.

=== Confuzz (2002–2003) ===
The second Kumm album, Confuzz (wordplay of "confuz", the Romanian word for "confused"), was released in June 2002. Unlike their first album, Confuzz is mostly sung in Romanian. On this album, Kumm started to make the transition to alternative rock, but they kept their ethno influences and added psychedelic sounds. Following the release, the band started to promote it across the country; they also had the chance to perform at several festivals, such as Days of Cluj, Fête de la Musique (Bucharest), and, most notably, Pepsi Sziget. Furthermore, Csergö Dominic, Petö Zoltán, Oigăn and Byron appeared in a play called "Pâine, orbi și saxofoane" (Romanian for "Bread, blind men and saxophones"), for which they also wrote the music. In the fall of 2002 the band filmed their third video, for the song "1000 de chipuri" ("1000 Faces"). The video was directed by Szakáts István and featured actor Sebastian Marina.

The first months of 2003 found some of the Kumm members involved in other projects. Kovács was invited to play on Luna Amară's debut album, Asfalt (Asphalt) (on a track called "Roșu aprins"), while Byron and Domi formed a new band, called Urma, with Mani Gutău as lead vocal; shortly after, they also released an album, Nomad Rhymes.

In the spring, Moonsweat March and Confuzz were distributed worldwide by the French label Musea Records. In April, Kumm participated at the Iuliu Merca Festival, making their first cover of a Romanian song, Semnal M's "Râul" ("The River"). Autumn brought them a contract with the Italian label Cramps Records. Shortly after, saxophonist Petö Zoltán left the band and was replaced by Mihai Iordache (ex-Sarmalele Reci, ex-Timpuri Noi). Drummer Csergö Dominic also retired for a while, and was temporarily replaced by Lorant Antal. Following this new lineup change, the band entered the studio, recording five songs in English. Four of them were included on an EP called Yellow Fever, which was officially released on December 5 at Sala Palatului, in Bucharest. At the end of the year, they filmed their fourth video, for the song "Butterflies".

=== Angels & Clowns and departure of Byron (2004–2005) ===
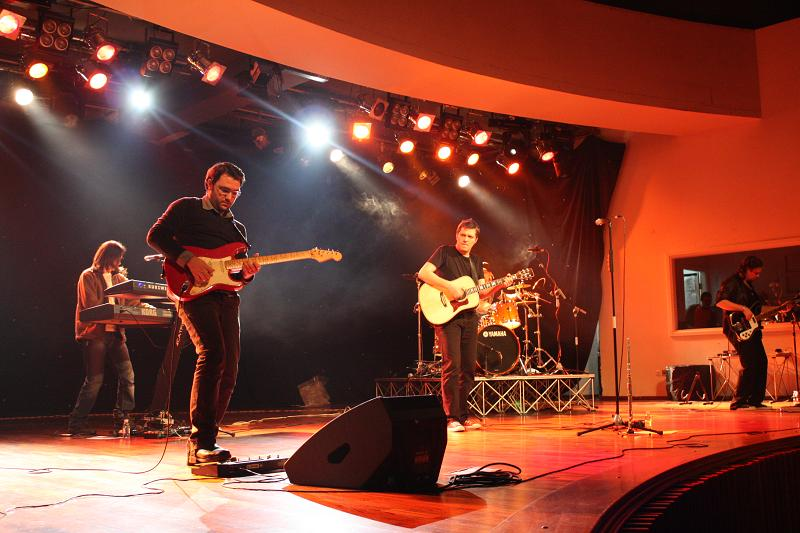
Dan Byron (center), the lead vocal of Kumm between 2001 and 2005, performing in Sarajevo with his band byron.

At the beginning of 2004, Kumm finished composing the songs for their third studio album, Angels & Clowns. The band spent the first month of spring in the studio, recording the new album. This release included the English version of "1000 de chipuri", called "Million Faces" (later the band also recorded an Italian version, "Mille Facce"), a new version of "Dictionary", a song from their debut album, with Byron singing lead vocals, and a rewritten and improved version of "Red Coffee", one of the songs from their first demo. Angels & Clowns, the title track, was the first Kumm song to reach the first place in a music chart.

In the summer of 2004, the band toured Italy for the first time. At the Gondola d'Oro Festival from Venice, the song "Mille Facce" won the prize for the best rock song. After returning in Romania, bassist Keresztes Levente decided to give up on music for architecture. The new Kumm bassist, Uțu Pascu (Blazzaj/BAU) made his debut with the band at Stufstock Festival. Shortly after, the band left Romania again and spent three weeks touring in Italy.

In February 2005, Kumm officially released Angels & Clowns, first in Bucharest, then in several other cities across the country. In spring, they played four gigs in Germany, where they met Anja Strub, who was later to become their manager.

After performing at Peninsula Festival and Stufstock, the band returned to Germany for another concert, which was their last concert with Byron as lead singer, as he left the band in September. While trying to find a new vocal, the members of the band also found time for their own projects: Iordache appeared as guest on Luna Amară's second studio album, Loc lipsă (Missing Place), on a track called "Din valuri ard" ("I Burn From Waves") and concentrated on his jazz music project, which also featured Oigăn and Uțu Pascu, while Csergö Dominic released a new album with Urma, entitled Anger as a Gift.

In November, Kumm were joined by the actor and singer Cătălin Mocan, formerly the lead vocal of the band Persona from Timișoara. Mocan was officially confirmed as the new lead singer of Kumm in January 2006.

=== Different Parties and the tenth anniversary of the band (2006–2009) ===
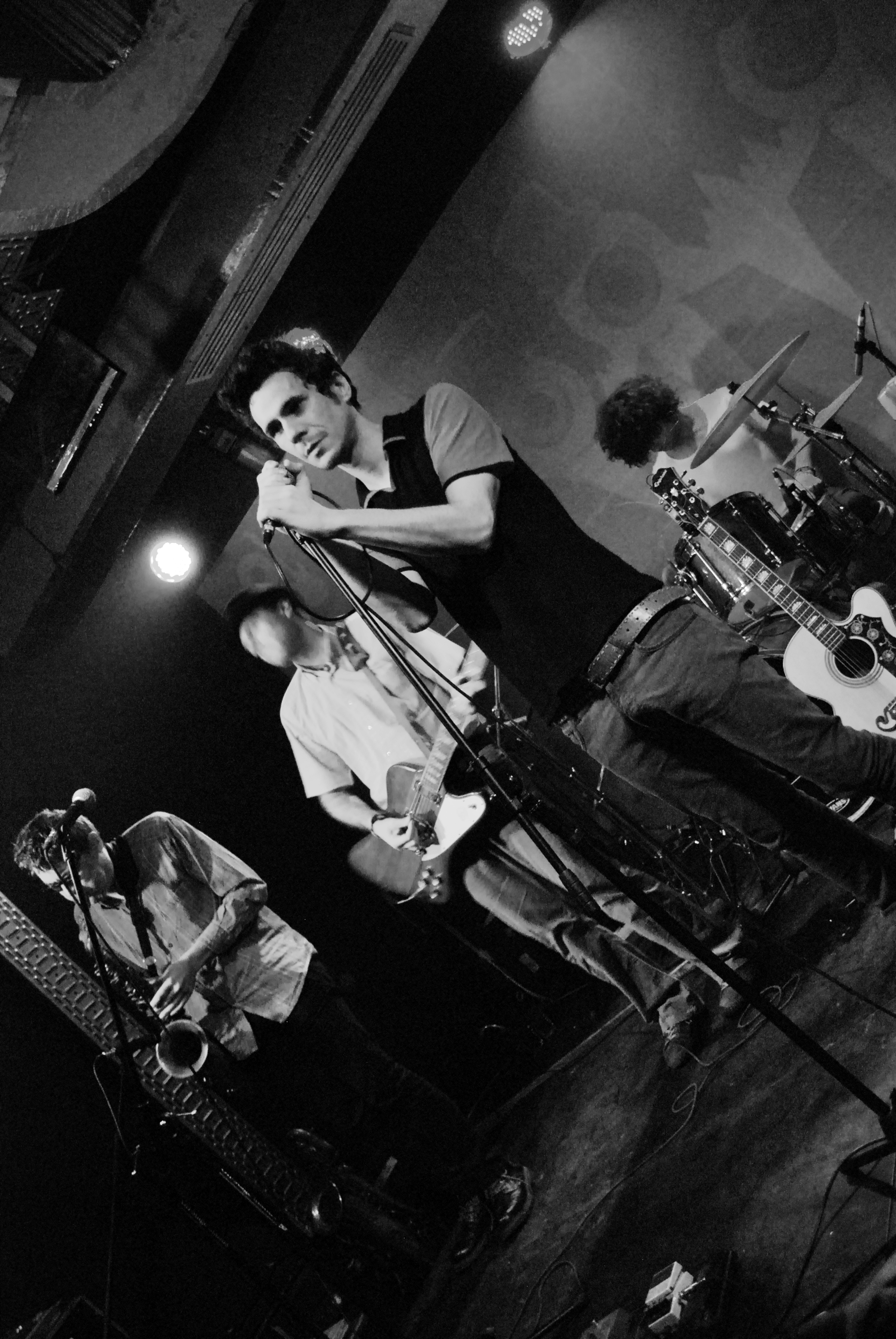
Cătălin Mocan (shown here during a 2010 Kumm concert), was confirmed as the lead singer of Kumm in January 2006.

The first concerts of Kumm with the new lineup took place at the end of January 2006. In March and April the band entered the studio and recorded a fourth album, Different Parties. It was considered their most diversified album to date. Before the official release, the band made a three weeks tour of Germany, with ten concerts (last three of them in Berlin) after which they performed a few gigs in Timișoara, Arad and Oradea. The official release of the album took place in Bucharest, on June 2.

In March 2007, after several gigs across the country, Kumm started their third tour of Germany, which lasted three weeks. The band performed in Berlin, Stuttgart, Ulm, Karlsruhe and Freiburg. After returning to Romania, they continued to play in different music pubs around the country and participated in the summer of 2007 to many festivals, such as Fête de la Musique, Rock'n'Coke Festival, Școala Ardeleană Festival, Cramps Festival and Peninsula.

On October 29, 2007, Kumm celebrated their ten years anniversary with a concert held at the Romanian Opera, KUMM – 10 ani și 1000 de Chipuri (KUMM – 10 Years and 1000 Faces). They invited Luna Amară, Timpuri Noi, ZOB, Travka, Ada Milea and The MOOoD to perform as guests. Each of these bands performed a song on their own and a Kumm song. The former members of the band participated as well. On the same occasion, Kumm also released a box-set entitled Lo-Fi Poetry, with songs, pictures and rare recordings from their ten years of musical activity.

In December, bassist Uțu Pascu left the band, and was replaced in January 2008 by Sorin Erhan (Firma, Urma).

On August 16, 2008, Kumm performed at the Sziget Festival, being the only Romanian band invited. It was their second performance at Sziget.

On March 6, 2009, Oigăn released Sex with Onions, his first solo album, and, according to his own words, his last. The official release was celebrated with a gig at Silver Church. Mihai Iordache, Csergö Dominic, Alexei "Alioșa" Țurcan (ex-Travka), Andrei Filip (Timpuri Noi, L'Orchestre de Roche, The Mono Jacks, RedRum) and Forrest (ZOB) appeared as guests. The album received favorable reviews.

On 12 March 2009, Kumm received the prize for Best Rock on 2008 from the magazine Actualitatea Muzicală (Musical Actuality).

On 30 May 2009, it was officially confirmed that drummer Csergö Dominic was not part of Kumm anymore, and had been replaced by Paul Ballo (Go to Berlin, The Amsterdams). Later, Oigăn talked about how they acquired their new drummer: "We made a list with several drummers we liked, we saw him at a live concert, and after that, due to the Mafia that exists on Romanian music scene, where everybody knows everybody, we got his phone number, we met in a bar, he came to an audition and we chose him because he's really talented and very funny."

=== Far from Telescopes (2009–2011) ===
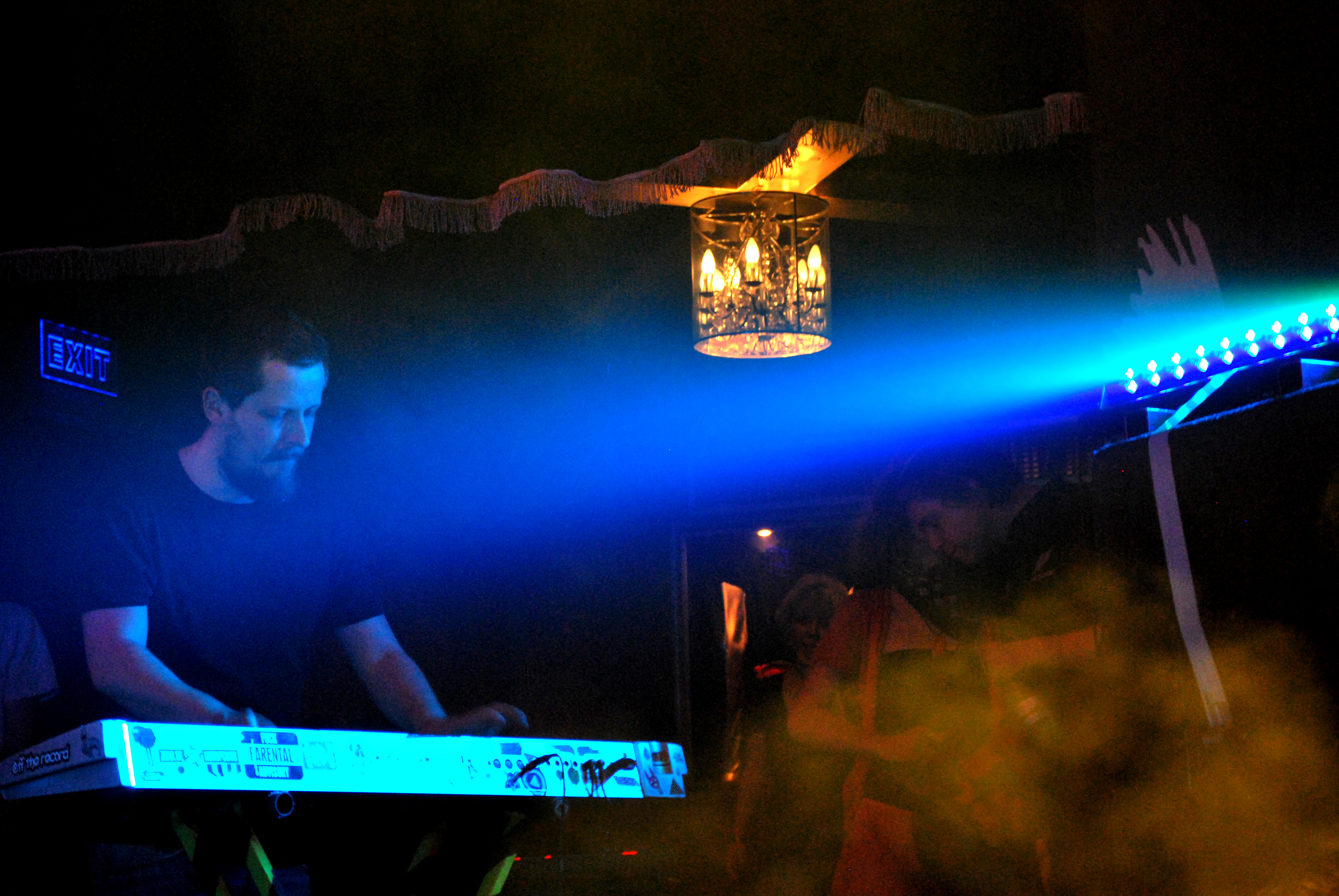
Kovács András of Kumm playing at the official release of the "Pop Song" video from the Far from Telescopes album in Silver Church, Bucharest.

On August 14, 2009, Kumm released the video for the song "Morsa" (translation: "Walrus") during a concert in El Grande Comandante. The English version of the song, "Man in a Can", was to appear on their fifth studio album.

On October 22 the band announced in a press conference at Clubul Țăranului Român the release of their fifth studio album, Far from Telescopes, which took place on October 30, 2009, at the Silver Church Club in Bucharest.

Far from Telescopes was produced under their own license. The recordings were made at the Vița de Vie studio, with Gabi "Pipai" Andrieș as sound engineer. The mastering was made by Mastervargas Studio, New York City. The album appeared on iTunes on January 11, 2010.

The title was explained by Oigăn in an interview: "It was really difficult for us to find a name. We broke a lot of deadlines, the album almost failed to be produced, yet we couldn't decide. At the end, right when we were playing the lo-fi songs, Cătălin sang that line and we all felt that this was describing the serious part of the album as well as its playful part."

The album featured Rozie, a good friend of the band, as guest vocalist on "Pink Balloon" and the Meloritm children choir on "Fishing in the Swimming Pool"; furthermore, their ex-singer Byron was also invited as backing vocalist on "Mister Superman". The band added three lo-fi recordings on the album: one of them at the beginning, before the song "Mister Superman", the second towards the middle of the album (the song "Bad Day", which is the only lo-fi song that has a title and appears on track list) and the third as hidden track, after the end of the last song, "Fishing in the Swimming Pool". Singer Cătălin Mocan came up with this idea: "These are recorded in a kitchen. We're really aboulic, we contradict each other a lot, so we had a lot of songs we had to give up on. I felt a little bit sorry for some of the songs we gave up. So I came up with this lo-fi idea, and that's how I convinced my mates to put on the album the songs I particularly liked. That's how 'Bad Day' entered the album."

Most of the reviews were positive. A critic called Far from Telescopes "perhaps the most mature and professional Kumm album" In December, the first single, "Pop Song", peaked at number 1 in Radio Guerrilla's Top Show.

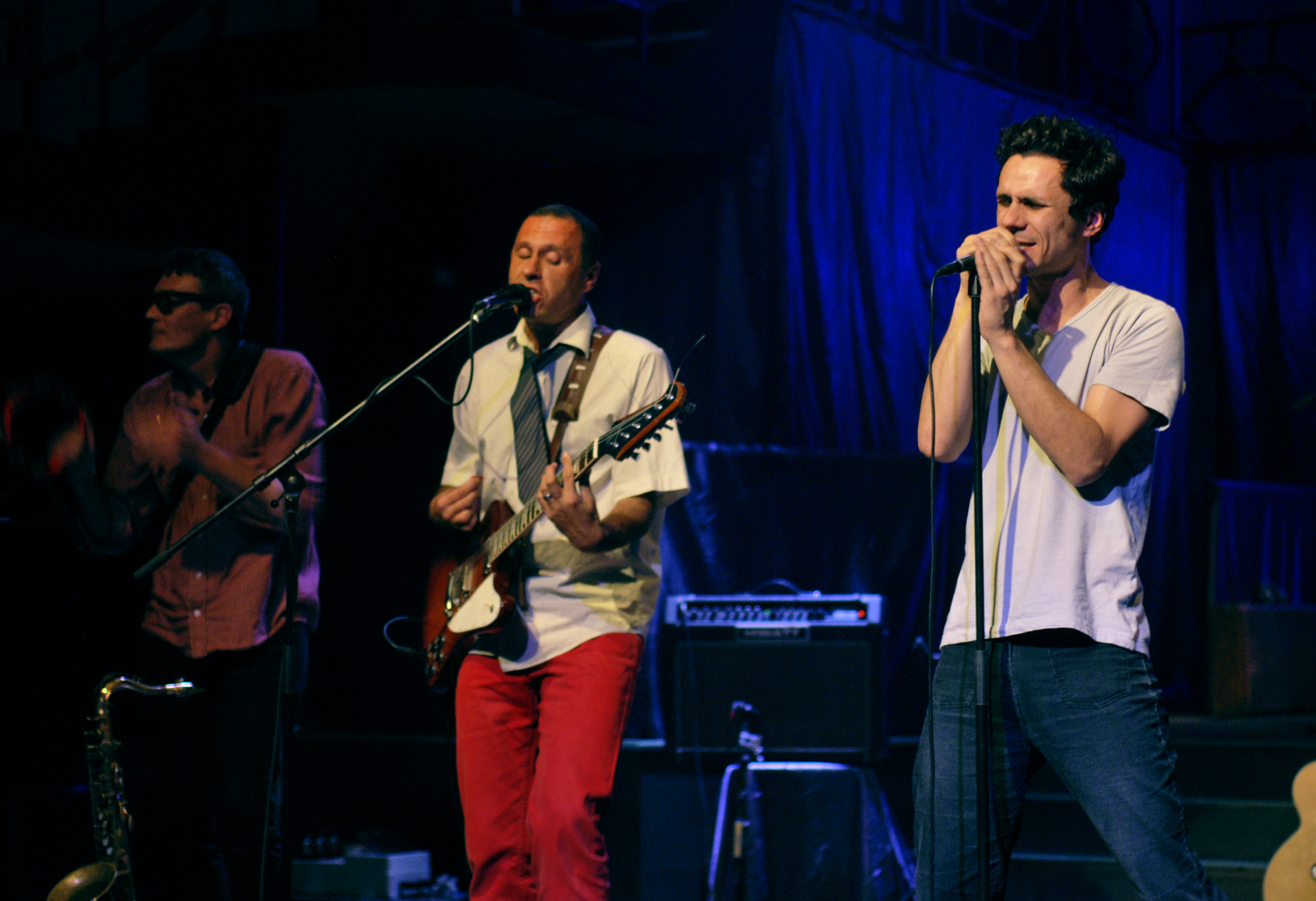
Kumm playing at Jukebox Club in Bucharest. Left from right: Mihai Iordache, Oigăn, Cătălin Mocan.

At the beginning of 2010, Kumm changed their lineup again. On 17 February they announced bassist Sorin Erhan was replaced by Alexandru Miu (Go to Berlin). Meanwhile, Paul Ballo composed and released "Chroma", the first song of his new project, Hot Casandra – during the year, this was to be followed by a few more songs.

In March their song "Police" was aired on Radio Guerrilla, entering on seventh place in Top Show and reaching first place two weeks later.

In April, Paul Ballo and his ex-bandmate from Go to Berlin, Matei Țeposu started a new electronic music project, called Trouble Is.

On April 22, 2010, Kumm released their sixth video, "Pop Song", at a concert held in Silver Church Club, Bucharest.

On September 25, drummer Paul Ballo announced on his Facebook page that he was not part of Kumm anymore. His statement was confirmed indirectly by the band two days later, on September 27, when the new Kumm site was launched. A new lineup appeared on the site, with new drummer John Ciurea (formerly with Tep Zepi). The next day, on September 28, Kumm announced the lineup change on their Facebook and Twitter pages. The first gig with the new drummer took place in Lăptăria lui Enache, on October 2.

In an interview which appeared on October 5, Ballo talked about the whole situation, explaining that he knew that at a certain point he would have left the band, but he didn't expect to be fired. He cited as a possible reason for separation the fact that he was also involved in other projects, so his bandmates believed that he was not paying enough attention to the band. The ex-drummer said that he thought at certain moments that, musically speaking, the band was somehow stagnating, adding "I did not have time to get involved in the (album) production, especially the sound of my drums. That was a reason for me to complain, because I wasn't quite satisfied with the drum sound, and they disagreed with me." In the same interview, Paul Ballo also talked about his own musical projects, specifying that he wanted to release a video with Trouble Is and continue as a drummer in Go to Berlin.

In December 2010, Radio Guerrilla started to air the song "Beautiful Country", which soon reached the first place in the Top Show.

In March 2011, Kumm announced on their Facebook official page the departure of Alexandru Miu and the returning of Uțu Pascu, stating: "Our new bassist is our old one". No further explanations were given.

=== Fifteenth anniversary of the band, departure of Cătălin Mocan and A Mysterious Place Called Somewhere (2011–2014) ===
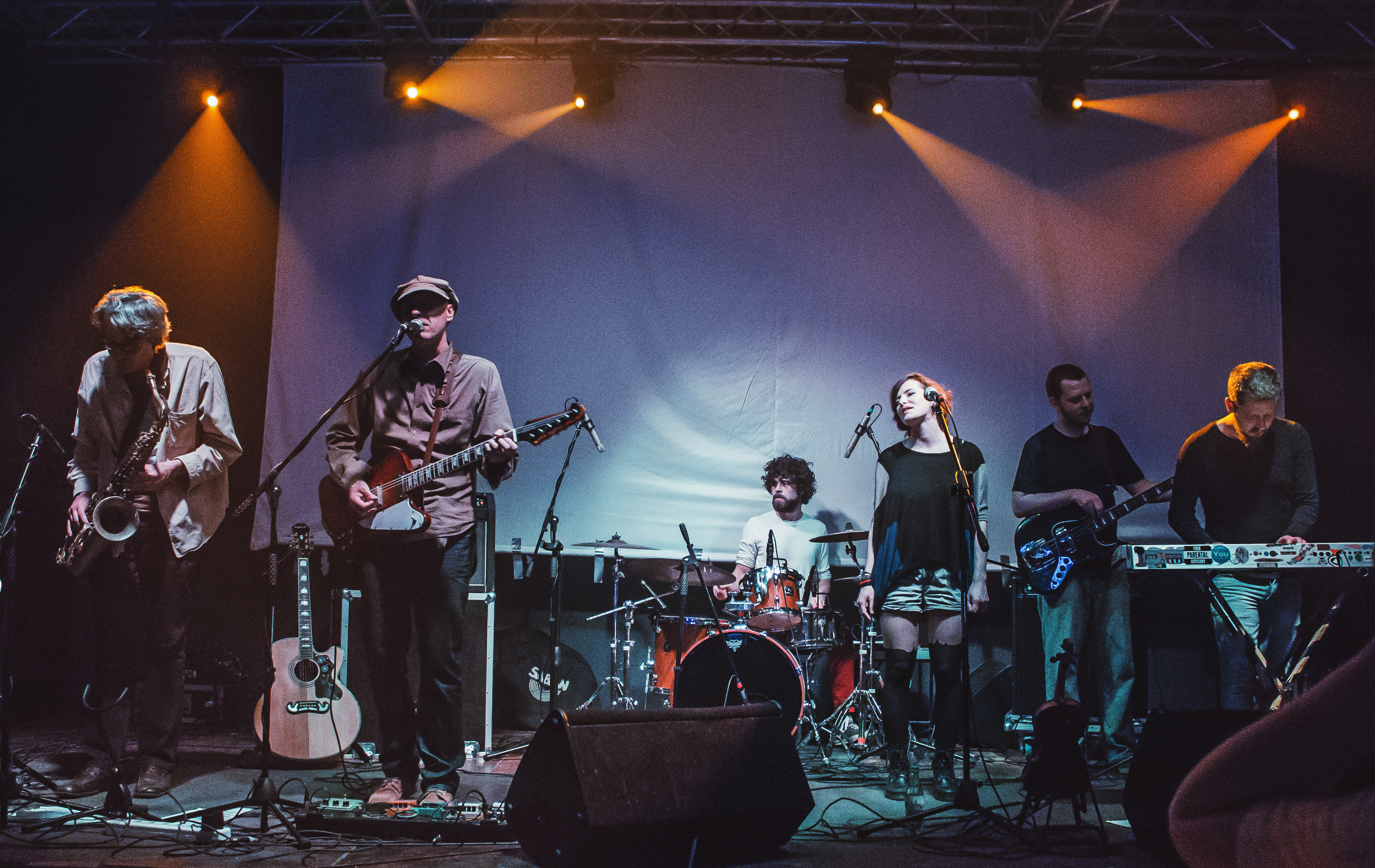
Kumm performing in Colectiv Club, March 2014. Left from right: Mihai Iordache, Oigăn, John Ciurea, Ana-Cristina Leonte, Uțu Pascu, Kovács András.

On June 3, the band released a new song, called "Foul Play", during a concert in Clubul Țăranului Român. The song was aired for the first time at Radio Guerrilla, on June 7. "Foul Play" was also launched on the internet, as a free download.

In October 2011, the band toured Germany and Switzerland. In November, Kumm released a new single called "Eskimo", during a campaign entitled "Where Do Broken Hearts Go? By Kumm". The campaign debuted with a contest for fans, who had to send an email with the answer to the question "Where do broken hearts go?", thus having the chance to win a special prize offered by the band. A national tour followed soon after.

In 2012, Kumm celebrated their fifteenth anniversary with a national tour, "Kumm 15 ani" ("Kumm 15 Years"). The first two concerts were held in Cluj (October 19, Flying Circus Pub) and Bucharest (November 1, Silver Church). Both concerts featured byron as opening act; ex-members of Kumm Dan Byron and Csergö Dominic performed as guests with the band. The Bucharest concert also featured Mani Gutău from Urma and Artanu'.

On January 22, 2013, the band announced on their Facebook page the departure of their lead singer Cătălin Mocan and their decision to continue as a five-piece band, with Oigăn assuming Mocan's vocal duties. Kumm also confirmed that they were working on their sixth studio album. The first concert with the new lineup was held in Flying Circus Pub, Cluj, on February 1; the band performed with Călina Curticăpean as guest vocalist, and kept touring with her for a while.

On May 17, Kumm released a video for the song "Să nu spui nimănui" (Romanian for "Don't tell anyone"), produced by Kovács András. The song featured Călina Curticăpean at vocals and was the band's first song in Romanian since "Morsa".

During the summer of 2013, jazz musician Ana-Cristina Leonte joined the live lineup of the band, replacing Curticăpean as guest vocalist.

On November 28, the band released a video for the song "One in a Million"; the video was directed by Vlad Gliga.

On November 29, Kumm were invited by Radio Guerrilla to perform at the event "9 concerte pentru 9 ani" (Romanian for "9 concerts for 9 years") organized by the station in order to celebrate their ninth anniversary.

In December, Oigăn released the first album of his new project, Moon Museum; the release was accompanied by a concert at J'ai Bistrot, Bucharest.

On February 6, 2014, Kumm released their sixth studio album, A Mysterious Place Called Somewhere. The concert took place at The Tube in Bucharest, and featured former lead singer Dan Byron, singer Luiza Zan, Cristi Csapo from Grimus, Ana-Cristina Leonte and Călina Curticăpean. The band began a national tour in order to promote the new album; the tour included Timișoara, Oradea, Iași, Brașov and Târgu Mureș. The reviews were positive, the album being described as a "reaffirmation of an important band for the Romanian musical scene" and "a sonic medicine for the soul".

In April 2014, the song "Să nu spui nimănui" was nominated for The Best Indie / Alternative Rock at One Air Music Awards.

Kumm continued to tour in April and May, visiting Baia Mare and Constanța.

On June 16, Kumm concerted during Guerrilive Radio Session at Radio Guerrilla and on June 30 they opened for Billy Idol at Cluj-Napoca along with Les Elephants Bizarres and RoadKillSoda.

During autumn, Oigăn was confirmed as the new bass player for Robin and the Backstabbers. Kumm continued their live concerts, performing at Focus Festival (Sibiu) along with Omul cu Șobolani, Coma and Gojira and at FILIT (Iași).

=== Anniversary of Confuzz, hiatus and return of Cătălin Mocan (2015–2024) ===
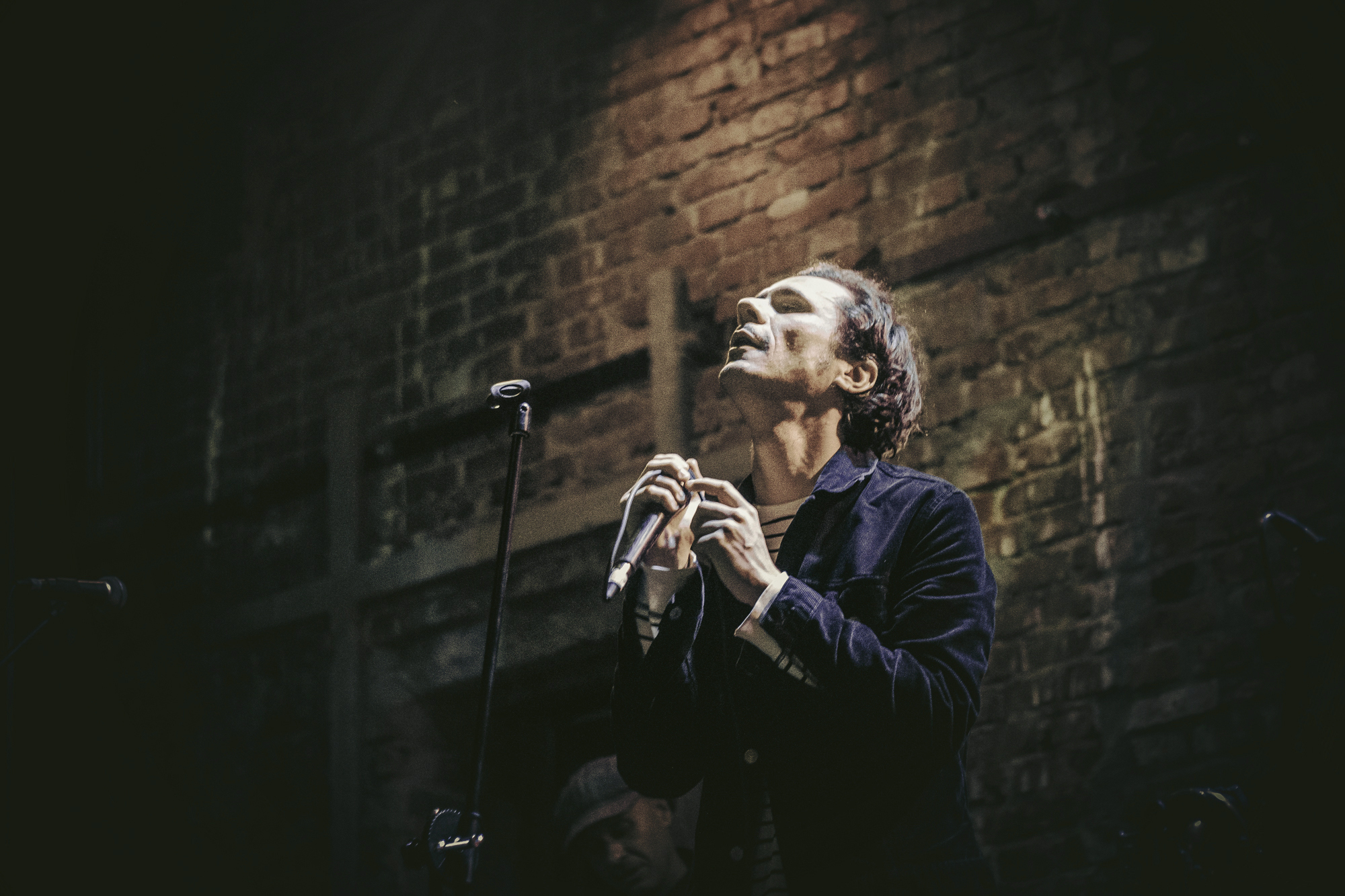
Cătălin Mocan performing at Caritabil Fest, in Expirat Club, June 2017. The concert marked his return as a lead singer for Kumm after a four-year absence.

In January 2015, Kumm announced their intention to celebrate 150 months since the release of their second album, Confuzz, with a small national tour featuring Dan Byron, their former lead vocal between 2001 and 2005. The tour began at the end of January, continuing in February, and included Bucharest, Cluj-Napoca, Iași and Galați.

On June 12, Kumm performed at Arenele Romane, during Street Delivery Nights, sharing the stage with Robin and the Backstabbers and byron. On July 3, the band appeared at the fifth edition of Rocker's Challenge, at Sasca Română.

On August 15, 2015, Kumm concerted at Grădina cu Filme in Bucharest with a different line-up which included Anghel Mailat (Brum) at bass guitar and Tavi Scurtu at drums, replacing John Ciurea.

Following the Colectiv nightclub fire, Kumm posted on their Facebook page a message of support for the victims and their families.

The band was in hiatus for most of 2016, with the exception of a concert in Cluj-Napoca during Rocking the city.

On June 1, 2017, Kumm performed three songs during the first edition of Caritabil Fest, a festival organized for three young cancer patients in remission. The concert marked the return of Cătălin Mocan as lead vocal after an absence of four years, and also the return of John Ciurea as drummer.

During the following years, Kumm continued to occasionally play live; they celebrated 15 years since the release of Different Parties in 2021 via an online concert streamed by the Overground Showroom platform. The concert featured Lucia and Muse Quartet as guests.

=== Oigăn's departure, a new line-up (2025-present) ===
In August 2025, Kumm announced the departure of founding member Oigăn, as well as the departures of long time members Dan Georgescu and John Ciurea. The band subsequently completed their line-up with Mihnea Ferezan (guitar), Ionuț Deliu (bass) and Casian Vlad (drums), and confirmed plans to tour again in 2026 and to release new songs.

=== Additional projects ===
Many of Kumm's former members, as well as the current ones, have additional musical projects. Csergö Dominic and Sorin Erhan are part of Urma, a band in which Dan Byron sang as well. Oigăn released a solo album, called Sex with Onions, while Iordache released two albums with his funk jazz band.

== Discography ==
Studio albums

- Moonsweat March (2000)
- Confuzz (2002)
- Angels & Clowns (2005)
- Different Parties (2006)
- Far from Telescopes (2009)
- A Mysterious Place Called Somewhere (2014)

EP's

- Yellow Fever (2003)
- Foul Play (2011)

== Members ==
=== Current members ===
- Cătălin Mocan – lead vocals (2005–2013; 2017–present)
- Kovács András – keyboards (1997–present)
- Mihai Iordache – saxophone (2003–present)
- Mihnea Ferezan – guitar (2025–present)
- Ionuț Deliu – bass guitar (2025–present)
- Casian Vlad – drums (2025–present)

=== Former members ===
- Meier Zsolt – saxophone (1997–1999)
- Pap Joco – drums (1997–2000)
- Petö Zoltán – saxophone (2000–2003)
- Keresztes Levente – bass guitar (2000–2004)
- Dan Radu (Byron) – lead vocals (2001–2005)
- Csergö Dominic – drums (1999–2009)
- Sorin Erhan – bass guitar (2008–2010)
- Paul Ballo – drums (2009–2010)
- Alexandru Miu – bass guitar (2010–2011)
- Uțu Pascu – bass guitar (2004–2008; 2011–2014)
- Eugen Nuțescu (Oigăn) – rhythm and lead guitar, vocals, harmonica (1997–2025)
- Dan Georgescu – bass guitar (2015–2025)
- John Ciurea – drums (2010–2015; 2017–2025)

=== Former touring members ===
- Călina Maria Curticăpean – vocals (2013)
- Ana-Cristina Leonte – vocals, violin (2013–2015)
