= Forbidden Drama =

Studio album by byron
- Released: 12 October 2007
- Recorded: Real Sound & Vision by Victor Panfilov
- Genre: Progressive rock, art rock, neo-prog
- Length: 67:34
- Label: A&A Records
- Producer: byron and A&A Records

Byron chronology
Forbidden Drama (2007)	A Kind of Alchemy (2009)

Forbidden Drama is the debut studio album by Romanian alternative/progressive rock band byron. Released on 12 October 2007 in Bucharest, it contains the single "Essential Piece". This single charted for a very long while on national radio stations, including City FM and Radio Total. The real hit, however, would turn out to be the second single, "Blow Up My Tears", which would stay at No. 1 in City FM's RomTop for several weeks. "Forbidden Drama" features a wide array of instruments including a string quartet, oboe and esraj. The album was manufactured and distributed by Romanian label A&A Records.

== Music ==
The album features an eclectic mix of art rock and adult-alternative, with progressive and classical hints. The band themselves acknowledge having been influenced by Queen, Jethro Tull, Peter Gabriel or My Brightest Diamond. Some reviewers noted certain Chris Cornell and Bryan Ferry influences in Dan Byron's vocals, while the music exhibited progressive overtones which drew comparisons with Dream Theater and Genesis.

== Concept ==
Forbidden Drama was conceived as a concept album, with 13 songs structured like a theatre play – with three acts and an epilogue. The lyrics deal with topics of alienation, consumerism, herd behavior, breaking the mold and the freedom of the individual. These themes were in part inspired by the bands' own history, given that their manager was a "corporate type" and their guitar player has a background as a lawyer. The album therefore showcases a transition process, from the corporate, depersonalized life depicted in "Fake Life" to a more artful, carefree existence in "No Man's Land". The title was considered representative, as the modern society "forbids small-scale, personal dramas".

== Track listing ==
Original release All songs written by Dan Byron except as indicated.
No.	Title	Music	Length
1.	"Fake Life"	Dan Byron	7:00
2.	"Forbidden Drama"	Dan Byron	4:26
3.	"Crossroads"	Dan Byron	4:27
4.	"Watercolor"	6fingers	3:11
5.	"Losing Control"	Dan Byron	5:01
6.	"The Dawn of a Drunk Bum"	Dan Byron	5:32
7.	"Far Away"	Dan Byron	5:49
8.	"Annoying Detail"	Dan Byron	5:27
9.	"On The Road"	Dan Byron	5:59
10.	"Essential Piece"	Dan Byron	3:48
11.	"Blow Up My Tears"	Dan Byron	6:00
12.	"No Man's Land"	Dan Byron	5:39
13.	"Toast Proposal"	Dan Byron	5:15
Total length:			67:34

== Personnel ==
byron

- Dan Byron – vocals, acoustic guitar, flute, triola
- Costin Oprea – electric guitar, backing vocals on "No Man's Land"
- Cristi Mateşan – drums
- 6fingers – keyboards, backing vocals on "No Man's Land"
- Gyergyay Szabolcs – bass

Additional musicians

- Mihai Balabaş – violin
- Iustin Galea – violin
- Andreea Retegan – viola
- Alexandru Gorneanu – cello
- Miron Grigore – oboe
- Rodica Gondiu – esraj
- Peter Michaud – recitative on "Fake Life"
- Iulian Pâslaru – backing vocals on "No Man's Land"
- Codruţ Dumitrescu – backing vocals on "No Man's Land"

Production

- Produced by byron and A&A Records
- Executive producer – Andi Enache
- Mixed and mastered by Victor Panfilov at Real Sound & Vision
- Design – VERTICALS
- Photography – Cristi Roşca, Dorian Radu, Anca Radu
- Management – Codruţ Dumitrescu
