= Florin Barbu =

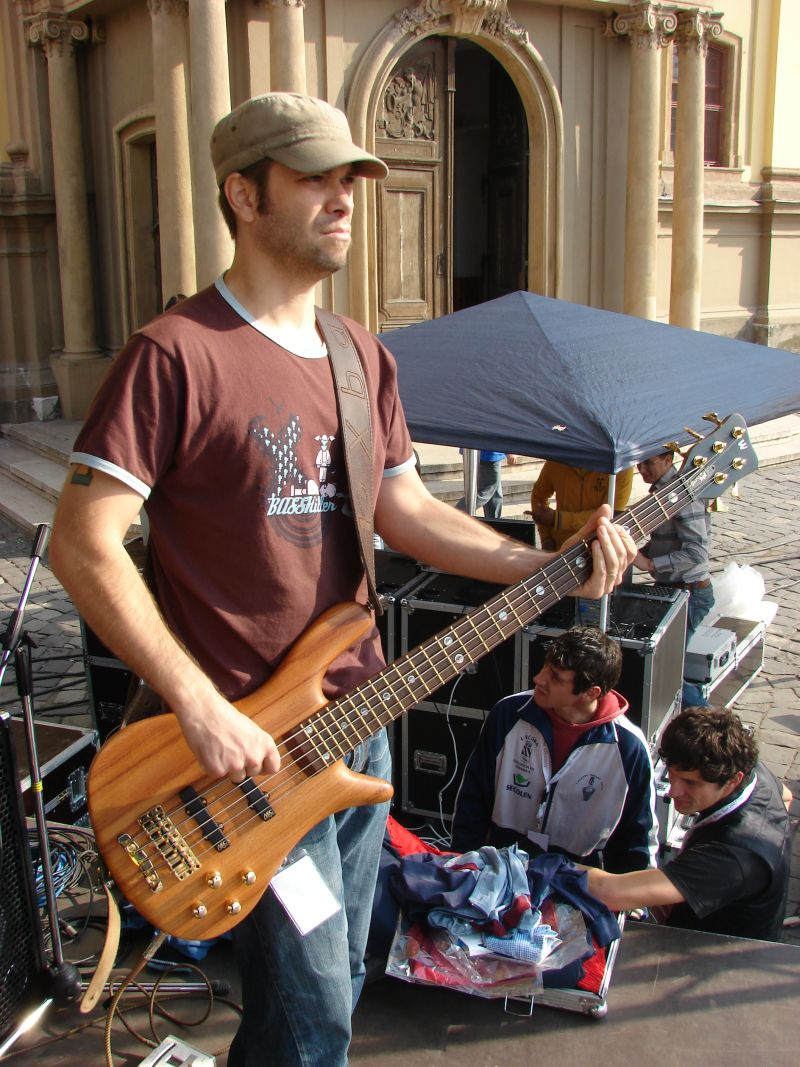
- Florin Barbu in Timișoara with his Warwick bass guitar

Background information
- Birth name: Florin Barbu
- Born: April 6, 1974 (age 50); Sibiu, Romania
- Genres: Pop/Rock, Jazz fusion, Rock
- Occupation: Musician
- Instrument: Bass guitar
- Years active: 1994–present
- Website: Romanian Bass Community

Florin Barbu (born 6 April 1974 in Sibiu, Romania) is a bass player. Florin played in Romanian bands Arca, Timpuri Noi, Proconsul, Blazzaj, Partizan and Cargo. Florin Barbu was awarded with Cultural Merit Order, as Knight. In 2017 he became Honorary Citizen of Timișoara.

== Biography ==
Barbu started playing bass guitar at the age of 14 after he loaned his bike to a neighbour who had a bass guitar. He arrived in Timișoara at the medicine school, but after 3 years he dropped out to pursue music. In 1994 he joined the band Arca from Timișoara solely because there were no other bass guitarists available. His skills were not as developed as those of the other Arca members, but he studied hard in order not to be kicked out from the band. Two years later he received "The best Romanian bass guitarist of the year" award from the magazines "Vox Pop Rock" and "Panoramic". In 1996, with his friend Eddie Neumann, he started a project called FunkinLeFree which in 1998 was renamed Blazzaj. After that in 2001 he joined Timpuri Noi and Partizan. He also collaborated with A.G. Weinberger (2000), Big Mamou (2001) and between 2002 and 2009 has been Proconsul's bass player. Barbu was strongly influenced by Timișoara's bassists Dixie Krauser, Christian Podratzky, Josef Kappl and many other musicians who helped him to evolve as a musician. In 2004 he started "XBass" - an online community meant to help young bassists in their way. The community grew to be very active and occasionally organizes meetings. In 2009 Florin Barbu decided to leave Bucharest, and moved to Sibiu. He left Proconsul as well, and started the band AZZA with former Blazzaj member - Eddie Neumann, Luiza Zan, and Marcel Moldovan. In 2012 he rejoined Partizan, but he left them in 2013 in order to join the Romanian rock legends - CARGO

Florin Barbu is also a Warwick bass community forum administrator.

== Equipment ==
Barbu is a Warwick basses endorsee.

- Warwick Streamer Stage II (5 strings)
- Warwick Custom Shop Streamer Stage II XBASS (5 strings)
- "Miss Lucy" 1987 Streamer (5 strings)

== Discography ==
- 1998 - Blazzaj with Blazzaj
- 2001 - Undeva in Europa with Stepan Project
- 2001 - Lucky Nights live with Timpuri Noi
- 2003 - Macadam with Blazzaj (First 2 tracks of the album)
- 2003 - 10 povesti with Proconsul
- 2005 - 5 with Proconsul
- 2005 - 10 porunci with Florin Chilian
- 2005 - Trancefusion with Endless Zone
- 2006 - Balade Pentru Tine with Proconsul
- 2007 - Dă Mai Departe with Proconsul
- 2009 - Sens Unic with Proconsul
- 2017 - Vinyl Live with Cargo
