= Byron (band) =

Romanian rock band

byron
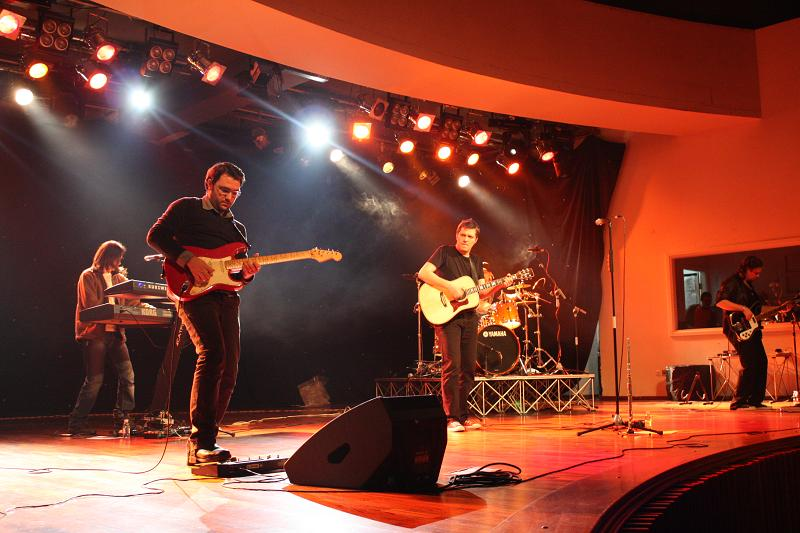
- byron live in Sarajevo, 2010

Background information
- Origin: Bucharest, Romania
- Genres: Alternative rock • pop rock • art rock • progressive rock • indie rock
- Years active: 2006–present
- Labels: A&A Records, Universal Music Romania
- Members: Dan Byron – vocals, guitar, flute Sergiu "6fingers" Mitrofan – keyboards, backing vocals László Demeter – bass Dany Serrano – guitar Andrei Ilie – drums
- Website: byronmusic.ro

Byron (stylized byron) is a Romanian alternative rock band formed in Bucharest in 2006. Dan Byron (real name Daniel Radu), former guest of Agathodaimon and ex-member of Urma and Kumm, initially wanted to start a solo project, but it soon developed into an actual band. Their music is hard to define; it would best be described as art-rock / adult-alternative with a lot of influences from different musical areas, mostly blues, progressive rock and jazz. Some songs are written in English, some in Romanian, and touch aspects of modern man's condition.

== History ==
=== Formation and Forbidden Drama (2006–2008) ===
In early 2006, Dan Byron began writing for what would later become byron's debut release. The band was assembled later that year, with guitarist Costin Oprea being the first to join in September. Keyboard player 6fingers (also in gothic metal band Magica) was recruited afterwards, soon followed by Cristi Mateşan on drums. To complete the line-up, the band was joined by bass player Gyergyay "Szabi" Szabolcs, freshly returned from Budapest. Rehearsals start in October 2006 and the band takes the stage for the first time on 1 December – a sold-out gig at Lăptăria Enache, one of Bucharest's most famed live music venues. Noteworthy later gigs include Art & Aids Bucharest, Stufstock 2007 at Vama Veche, and a special concept – a 3-band, 3-venues simultaneous concert held together with Timpuri Noi and Trupa Veche.

The debut album, Forbidden Drama, structured in acts, like a theater drama, was finished in September – with Victor Panfilov as musical producer, mixing and mastering at Real Sound Studio, Bucharest. The album is manufactured and distributed by the Romanian label A&A Records. Forbidden Drama has been released on 12 October 2007, at Fabrica club in Bucharest, followed by a month-long national promotion tour (Forbidden Tour).

=== Acoustic Drama (2008–2009) ===
In January 2008, bassist Gyergyay Szabolcs quits the band for personal reasons and is replaced by Jacob Glick. In this line-up, on 3 April 2008, the band played a special unplugged show at Teatru 74, an unconventional theater venue in the medieval citadel of Târgu Mureş. Old songs, as well as a couple of new ones, were rearranged for a full unplugged performance featuring instruments such as seven different guitars, a banjo, a mandolin, a cajón, an upright bass, an acoustic bass, a string quartet and a piano. The concert featured several guests, most notably Alexandru Andrieş and Paula Seling.

The show was recorded and released as the live DVD Acoustic Drama in October 2008, the first unplugged DVD ever released by a Romanian band. There were no later overdubs in the studio, as the band wanted the acoustic experience to be as natural as possible. The DVD contains 14 songs, a photo gallery, the video for "Blow Up My Tears" single (directed and shot by Oleg Mutu, edited by Victor Panfilov) and many "making of" features. A notable song is "Departe", a translated version of "Far Away" off Forbidden Drama, with Romanian lyrics provided by Alexandru Andrieş.

The DVD was released with a special unplugged show at Palatul Copiilor in Bucharest, followed by a national tour spanning four major cities – Sibiu, Târgu Mureş, Iaşi and Cluj. For the tour, the band hooked up with sponsors Nokia, promoting their new multimedia smartphones Nokia Nseries. A special website was created, where fans could record their live experiences and follow the band as they toured the country. Several videos were also uploaded on YouTube, featuring tour performances recorded with Nseries phones.

=== A Kind of Alchemy (2009–2010) ===
In October 2009 the band released their second album, A Kind Of Alchemy. The release marks an evolution in the band's sound, with blues, progressive and funk influences, employing a wider diversity of instruments. In Dan Byron's words, "The mood is nocturnal, rather intimate, sometimes playful or even exuberant". The 14 new songs came in a 7-inch-wide (180 mm) illustrated book, as the graphic aspect is just as important as the music.

In June 2010, the band applied a Creative Commons BY-NC-ND 3.0 License on their first and second studio albums which can now be downloaded freely from their blog.

=== Perfect and Live Underground (2011–2012) ===
Perfect was released on 17 February 2011, at The Silver Church Club in Bucharest (with the special guest – Grimus band). Feature of this album is that it consists of covers byron made of songs played by other Romanian artists (Kumm, Luna Amară, Timpuri Noi etc.), and the lyrics totally on Romanian language. In October 2011, the band has released a video for the fifth track from this album – "Granița-n raniță" (directed by Mattia Molini, for 5 days, in New York).

On 26–27 November 2010, byron played in Salina Turda (Turda salt mine) for their second DVD, Live Underground. There were two different live shows: the first unplugged concert, without spectators, was at Terezia mine, and the second electric – in amphitheatre at Rudolf mine. The special guests joined the band, such as Nicu Alifantis, Maria Ioana Mântulescu, Rene Popescu and Alexandru Gorneanu. The DVD was released on 3 May 2012, with participation of HBO Romania. It also has released on Blu-ray (limited edition).

In June 2012, the band released an official application for Android and iOS to let the others get the latest news and exclusive content from them.

In January 2013, byron announced their 4th album, which working title was Long Story Short. Afterwards it was changed to 30 Seconds of Fame like an innuendo on Andy Warhol's famous expression about 15 minutes of fame. The album was released on 16 March and was the first byron's album, which has an identical Romanian version, called 30 de secunde de faimă.

After that, the band was working with music producer Adam Balazs for the soundtrack of the original HBO Romania series Rămâi cu mine (Stay with me). An OST album called Melancolic was released in February 2014.

== Band members ==
=== Current members ===
- Dan Byron – vocals, guitar, flute (ex- Kumm, ex- Urma) (2006–present)
- Sergiu "6fingers" Mitrofan – keyboards, guitar, backing vocals (ex- Magica) (2006–present)
- László Demeter – bass (ex- Slang) (2012–present)
- Dany Serrano – guitar (2024-present)
- Andrei Ilie – drums (2021–present)

=== Former members ===
- Gyergyay Szabolcs – bass (2006–2008)
- Jacob Glick – bass (2008)
- Vladimir Săteanu – bass (2008–2010)
- Cristi Mateşan – drums (2006–2010)
- Marcel Moldovan – drums (2010–2011)
- Costin Oprea – guitars (2006–2013)
- Dan Georgescu

=== Live members ===
- Ovidiu Baciu – drums (2008–2009)
- Vlad Bolborea – drums (2011–2012)
- Gabriel Bălaşa – percussion (2010–2012)

== Discography ==
=== Studio albums ===
- Forbidden Drama (2007)
- A Kind of Alchemy (2009)
- Perfect (2011)
- 30 Seconds of Fame (2013)
- Melancolic (2014)
- Eternal return (2015)
- Noua (2019)
- Efemeride (2023)

=== DVD albums ===
- Acoustic Drama (2008)
- Live Underground (2012)

=== Singles ===
- "Road Trip" (2012)
