= A&A =

A&A may refer to:

== Computing, science and technology ==
- Astronomy and Astrophysics, a scientific journal
- Anesthesia & Analgesia, a medical journal

== Entertainment ==
- Several related games within the "Axis & Allies" franchise which all deal with World War II combat:
  - Axis & Allies, a series of strategy board games
  - Axis & Allies (2004 video game)
  - Axis & Allies Miniatures, a miniature wargaming system
- Angels & Airwaves, an alternative rock band
- Austin & Ally, a Disney Channel sitcom

== Other uses ==
- A&A Records, a defunct Canadian record store chain
