= A Kind of Alchemy =

Studio album by byron
- Released: 23 October 2009
- Recorded: Real Sound & Vision by Victor Panfilov
- Genres: Progressive rock, art rock, neo-prog
- Length: 63:10
- Label: A&A Records
- Producers: byron and A&A Records

Byron chronology
Forbidden Drama (2007)	A Kind of Alchemy (2009)	Perfect (2011)

A Kind of Alchemy is the second studio album from the alternative/progressive rock band byron. Released on 23 October 2009 at The Silver Church Club in Bucharest. It contains two singles, "Diggin' a Hole" and "King Of Clowns".

== Music ==
A Kind Of Alchemy contains blues, progressive and funk influences. Dan Byron said that "the mood is nocturnal, rather intimate, sometimes playful or even exuberant", and the album as a whole deals with the "process of creation, ranging from madness to zen". One part of the album has an extra sensitivity, another part is more aggressive, with a clear rhythm section.

== Track listing ==
Original release All songs written by Dan Byron except as indicated.
No.	Title	Music	Length
1.	"The Night"	Dan Byron	5:34
2.	"Zeitgeist"	Dan Byron	4:38
3.	"Diggin' a Hole"	Dan Byron	3:02
4.	"War"	Dan Byron	5:10
5.	"A Little Bit Deranged"	Dan Byron	3:37
6.	"I Don't Want To Entertain You"	Dan Byron	3:48
7.	"A Poem Without an End"	Dan Byron	7:44
8.	"King Of Clowns"	Dan Byron	4:56
9.	"The Song That Never Was"	6fingers	3:23
10.	"Sirens"	Dan Byron	3:51
11.	"Vitruvian Man"	Dan Byron	3:52
12.	"The Alchemist"	Dan Byron	4:09
13.	"Blinded By Sunshine"	Dan Byron	4:13
14.	"A Peaceful Mind"	Dan Byron	4:53
Total length:			63:10

== Personnel ==
byron

- Dan Byron – vocals, acoustic guitar, flute, melodica
- Costin Oprea – electric guitar
- Cristi Mateşan – drums
- 6fingers – keyboards, backing vocals, rhodes, accordion
- Vladimir Săteanu - bass

Additional musicians

- René Popescu - violin
- Ana Ghiţă - violin
- Alexandra Toader - viola
- Alexandru Gorneanu - cello
- Petre Ionuţescu - trumpet
- Jane D. - backing vocals on "A Little Bit Deranged"
- Lu Cozma - backing vocals on "War"

Production

- Produced by byron and A&A Records
- Mixed and mastered by Victor Panfilov at Real Sound & Vision
