= 30 Seconds of Fame =

Studio album by byron
- Released: 16 March 2013
- Recorded: Real Sound & Vision by Victor Panfilov
- Genre: Progressive rock, art rock, neo-prog
- Length: 49:52
- Label: A&A Records
- Producer: byron and A&A Records

Byron chronology
Perfect (2011)	30 Seconds of Fame (2013)

30 Seconds of Fame is the fourth studio album from the Romanian alternative/progressive rock band byron. It was released on 16 March 2013 at Palatul Naţional al Copiilor in Bucharest. It's the first bilingual album in band's discography - there is a Romanian version called 30 de secunde de faimă.

== Track listing ==
All tracks are written by Dan Byron, except as indicated

No.	Title	Music	Length
1.	"A Crazy Ballet"	Dan Byron	3:20
2.	"Tummo"	Dan Byron	3:59
3.	"I, Human"	6fingers	2:59
4.	"Chalk Line"	Dan Byron	3:40
5.	"It ain't Gonna Happen Today"	Dan Byron	3:02
6.	"The Game"	Dan Byron	4:57
7.	"Surrealistic Collage"	Dan Byron	3:53
8.	"Sleepwalkers"	Dan Byron	4:55
9.	"The Puppet"	Costin Oprea	3:13
10.	"Running In Circles"	Dan Byron	5:57
11.	"What If"	Dan Byron	3:32
12.	"Road Trip"	Dan Byron	4:00
13.	"Finale"	Dan Byron	2:29
Total length:			49:52

== Personnel ==
byron

- Dan Byron – vocals, acoustic guitar, flute, programming
- Costin Oprea – electric guitar
- 6fingers – keyboards, backing vocals, glockenspiel
- László Demeter - bass
- Dan Georgescu - drums

Additional musicians

- Luiza Zan - backing vocals
- Alexander Bălănescu – violin
- Petre Ionuţescu – trumpet
- Mircea Mutulescu – oboe
- Mihai Boboescu – bassoon
- Pablo Hopenhayn & Juan Ignacio Emme - strings

Production

- Produced by byron and A&A Records
- Mixed and mastered by Victor Panfilov at Real Sound & Vision
