= Sam the Record Man =

Canadian record store chain

Coordinates: 43.657599°N 79.381253°W

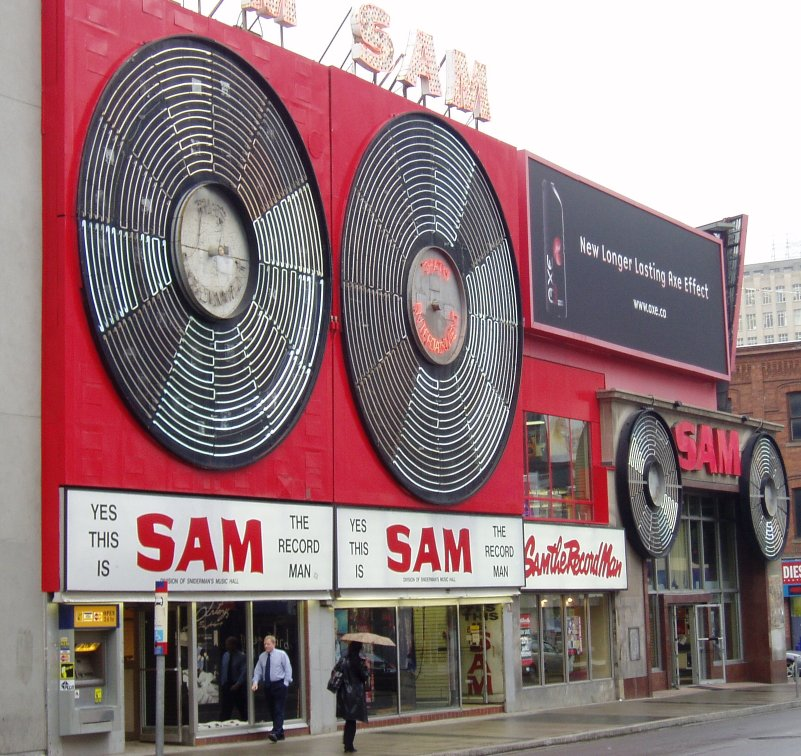
- Type: Private
- Industry: Record store
- Founded: 1937
- Defunct: 2007 (corporate chain)
- Headquarters: Toronto, Ontario, Canada
- Number of locations: 1 (2026)
- Key people: Sidney Sniderman; Sam Sniderman; Jason Sniderman; Robert "Bobby" Sniderman; Lana Sniderman
- Products: Music

Sam the Record Man was a Canadian record store chain that, at one time, was Canada's largest music recording retailer. In 1982, its ads proclaimed that it had "140 locations, coast to coast".

Its iconic flagship store was located at 259 Yonge Street in 1959 and moved to 347 Yonge Street two years later, remaining there from 1961 until it closed in 2007. Located at Yonge just north of Dundas, the store became part of a strip of music stores, nightclubs and taverns featuring live performance that produced the "Toronto Sound" and was the centre of Toronto's music scene in the 1960s.

The Yonge Street store was the best known store in the Sam the Record Man chain of 140 locations across Canada, two blocks away from the Toronto Eaton Centre and Sankofa Square. Sam's became a popular attraction, drawing people into its selection of LP records, and later cassettes and compact discs. It flourished in the Downtown Toronto area, quickly gaining notoriety and outselling the competition. What started as a single storefront had evolved into an entire block completely dedicated to the Sam the Record Man store. For several years, the store went into head-to-head competition with the popular A&A Records flagship store, just up the street, before the latter filed for bankruptcy in 1993. The building was demolished over a period of two years, from 2009 until 2011. It is part of the site on which Toronto Metropolitan University's (then known as Ryerson University) Sheldon & Tracy Levy Student Learning Centre was built. The store's iconic neon sign has been restored and installed in a new location overlooking nearby Sankofa Square.

The Information Age, competition with the HMV chain and other factors, forced Sam the Record Man into bankruptcy in 2001, but its flagship location remained in business until 2007. One independent franchise store, in Belleville, Ontario, continues to bear the Sam the Record Man name.

== Founding ==
Sniderman's Music Hall was launched in 1937 by Sam Sniderman (d. September 23, 2012) and Sidney Sniderman, as the record department in his family's existing store, Sniderman Radio Sales & Service, at 714 College Street (now home to L Squared Salon) in Toronto, which had itself been established in 1929 by Sidney Sniderman. In 1959, Sniderman's Music Hall moved to Yonge Street in order to compete with A&A Records, and was located in the basement of Yolle Furniture Store at 291–295 Yonge Street. On Labour Day 1961, the new store moved north to its location at 347 Yonge Street, two doors down from A&A, where it became a Toronto landmark. The flagship store of the competing A&A Records chain was located nearby at 351 Yonge Street. Steeles Tavern, a popular nightclub and live music venue, was between the two stores at 349 Yonge Street until it closed in 1974.

== Iconic neon signs ==
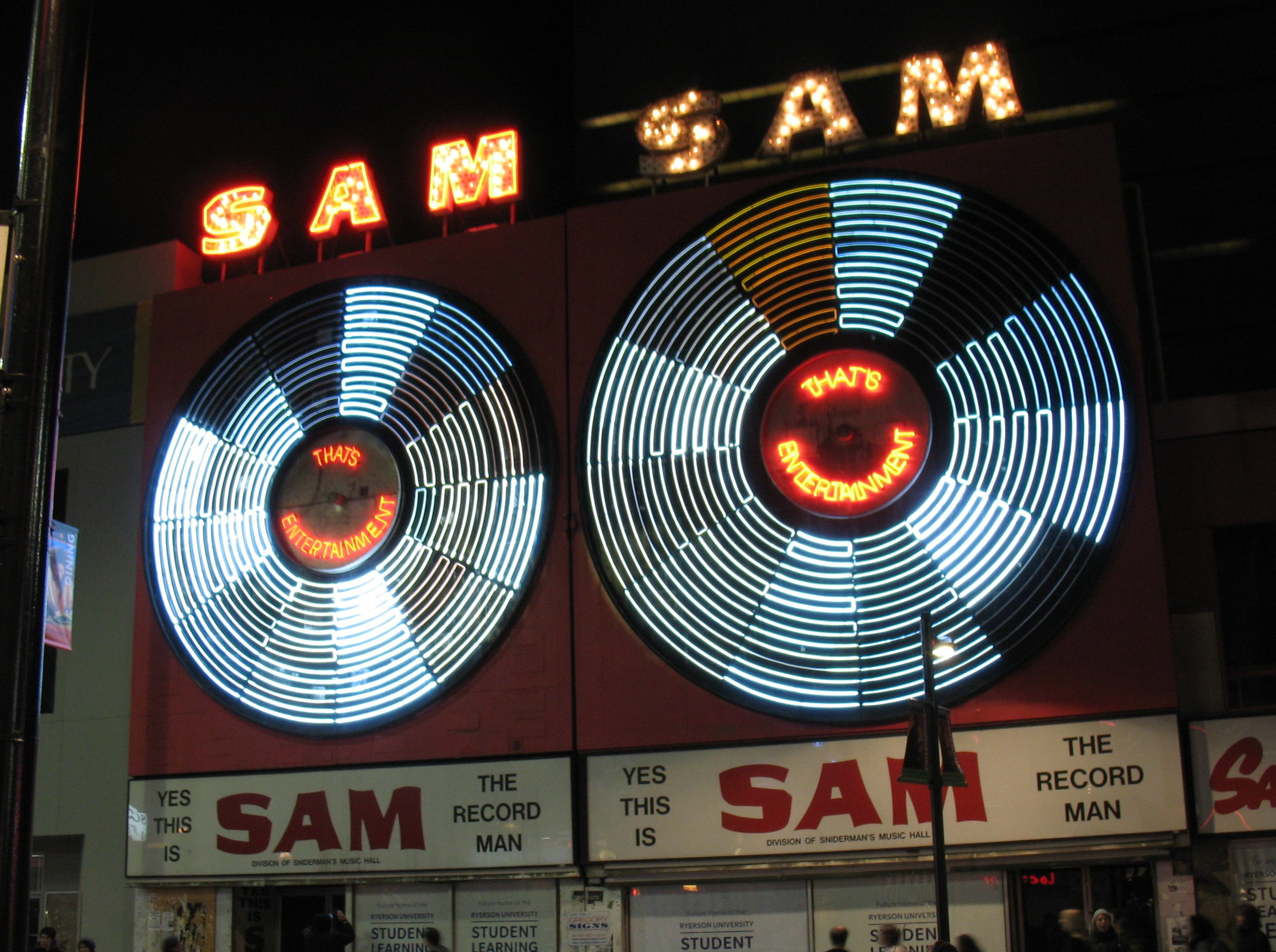
Sam's famous neon signs at night, the 'record' on the right is the original store, with the record to the left on the former Steele's Tavern.

The Yonge Street location was always noted for its kitschy signage.

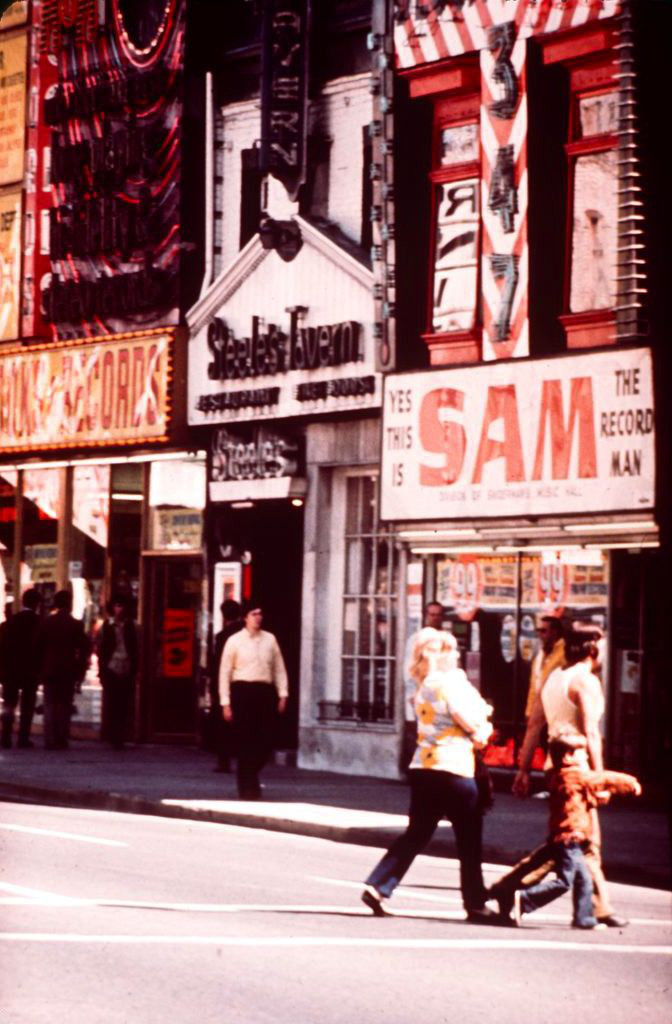
Store without the sign next to Steeles Tavern

With Sam the Record Man growing rapidly, the business added the first of two spinning records that would later become its trademark. The first record, added at 347 Yonge Street, was designed by the Markle Brothers in 1969–70; it was 7.5 metres (24.6 feet) wide and 8 metres (26.2 feet) tall. The second sign was added in 1987, just north of the original, at 349 Yonge Street (former Steeles Tavern Restaurant). It was designed by Claude Neon Inc. In that same year, the letters spelling out "SAM" were added above the records (it took 550 light bulbs to light up the two SAM signs), as was the lower signage that read "Yes this is SAM the Record Man". The insert in the middle of the records reading "That's Entertainment" was also added at this time. Its first neon signage included the store's address in large neon "347" numbers vertically aligned between two windows. On the left side was a thermometer made from neon. On the far right was a neon multi-sectioned triangle similar to the one on top of the Canada Life Building, which indicated weather conditions depending on how it was blinking. In the late 1960s, the iconic spinning record replaced the previous neon signs, with the second neon record being added in the mid 1980s. The buildings where the sign hung were two Second Empire structures (347 Yonge was formerly McDonald and Wilson Lighting store with the second floor bricked off to allow for the sign to be installed, 349 Yonge was Steeles' Tavern, whose upstairs windows had been bricked off when the store became a women's fashion store (Le Chateau) following the closing of the restaurant. Both buildings have since been demolished.

=== 1960s ===
A third floor was built onto the back portion of the original 347 Yonge Street store sometime in the 1960s and a basement stockroom was excavated. It served as the Third Floor Bargain Basement for many years before becoming the first video department for the store. Concert tickets were sold there for a time as well.

An additional property was purchased several stores to the north (371 and 375 Yonge?) which became Sam the Tape Man (formats open reel, 4 track, 8 track, and cassette) with Sam the Chinese Food Man upstairs. When Sam found out that his favourite Chinese restaurant was being demolished to make way for the new Toronto City Hall, Sam offered the restaurant the upstairs of his Sam the Tape Man store as a new location. It served as the venue for many flagship store, franchise, and record industry functions over the years. In the early 1970s, Sam the Tape Man was relocated to the 347 Yonge store and the space rented to an adult bookstore. The restaurant was eventually closed and the building sold and fully renovated into two Asian restaurants.

=== 1970s ===
The parking lot behind the adjoining Canadian Imperial Bank of Commerce (CIBC) at Yonge and Gould St. was purchased in the early 1970s and an annex built which housed the classical department and later added the tape department (now only cassettes and 8-tracks), when it was incorporated back into the 347 location. CIBC restricted the height of the annex building to slightly below the height of the bank building, which prevented the addition of a second story, though a low-ceiling mezzanine was included for use as a stock area.

=== 1980s ===
Steeles' Tavern at 349 Yonge Street closed in 1974 and the building was acquired by Sniderman in the early 1980s; however, the ground floor was rented out to a stereo equipment store. After cutting access doorways through the walls to the existing store, the second floor became the CD department and a greatly reduced-in-size Bargain Basement. Eventually the ground floor and basement of 349 Yonge Street were incorporated via doorways cut through the walls into the adjoining record store, with the 45s department moving to the back of 347 Yonge St. The ground floor of 349 Yonge became a greatly expanded CD department, the second floor became the video department, and a third floor was added to the back portion of the building to house the video rental library, staff lunchroom, and new staff washrooms. The Bargain Basement was restored to the third floor of 349 Yonge Street. When CDs were incorporated into their respective departments, the video store was relocated to the ground floor of 349 Yonge Street.

=== 1990s ===
The chain branched out into computer software and games in the mid-1990s and a new department, Sam The Interactive Man, was created on the now-adjoined and renovated third floors to house it. It was later moved briefly to the ground floor, prior to the expansion of the store into the CIBC property.

In 1991 the CIBC property (341, 343, and 345 Yonge Street) was purchased and the store was reconfigured yet again with the Pop/Rock department moving to the ground floor of the new property. New cashier stations were installed at the front of 347 Yonge where the pop/rock department had been. A two-stage plan of renovation/construction involving the CIBC building and the classical annex were drawn up but only the first stage of the reconstruction was completed. The renovations comprised the creation of doorways from the CIBC building into the classical annex, the addition of stairs and a mezzanine which became the new location for Sam The Interactive Man. When the interactive department was closed it became the Nexx Level, which comprised the relocated R&B/Soul/Rap/Electronic department. The Jazz department was moved to the second floor of 349 Yonge St. and the Pop Vocal and Instrumental departments moved to the second floor where jazz had been. Huge outdoor video screens were installed by an advertising firm on the (rented) lower portions of the roof of the former CIBC building. Extensive neon signage, including a replica of the original neon sign for Sniderman Radio Sales & Service, was installed in the former CIBC building. The third floor was turned into offices and fulfilment area when the store expanded to online sales.

=== 2000s ===
Major renovations followed the re-consolidation of the company after bankruptcy (January 2002). Much of this work was redecoration of the sales areas in terms of painting, lighting, flooring, and the inclusion of vintage fixtures such as a bar with mirrors, a wood-and-glass display cabinet, and a barbershop counter/mirror. Classical was moved to the newly renovated ground floor of 349 Yonge Street and the Jazz, Blues, & Folk department was temporarily moved back to the second floor of 349 Yonge St. while redecorating took place, then moved back when the renovations were completed. The former classical annex was transformed into a new DVD department, complete with a chandelier, theatrical spotlights, drapes, popcorn machine, 5.1 sound system, video monitors, neon sign, and theatre marquee. A small stage was also added for in-store performances. Renovations were also done on the ground floor of 347 Yonge, primarily the addition of a magazine section and a new cashier desk. The Pop/Rock Department and Nexx Level were also renovated. The former parkette (Hacksel Place) and chess tables on Gould Street were made over and incorporated into a café added to the Pop/Rock department. At one point limited menu food service was provided by Lick's hamburger chain.

== Notable customers ==
Sam Sniderman was known as a friend to people starting out in the Canadian music industry, and helped jumpstart the careers of the likes of Anne Murray, Rush, Gordon Lightfoot and The Guess Who, who were all known to appear at the store from time to time.

== Bankruptcy and change of ownership ==
When the Sam the Record Man chain was forced into bankruptcy in 2001, Sniderman's sons Jason and Robert ("Bobby") took over the flagship store. The two men kept the store running until announcing on May 29, 2007, that the store would close permanently on June 30 of that same year, citing the impact of technology on record sales as the determining factor of the closure.

== The flagship store in film and music ==
The double-disc neon sign is frequently visible in films shot in Toronto that use Yonge Street as a location. Recent examples include the 2008 film The Incredible Hulk, which features the signs prominently during the final battle sequences, and the CTV/CBS series Flashpoint, which is set in Toronto.

For a brief time in the 1910s, 347 Yonge Street was the location of music publishers Chappell & Co, now Warner/Chappell Music.

== Building the chain ==
Los Lobos at Sam the Record Man

The flagship Sam the Record Man store was famous for its Boxing Day sales and often served as the location for newspaper and television reports on Boxing Day shopping. Shoppers would line up over many city blocks, in the cold, to get one-day-only specially discounted (20%–25%) records, and eventually, as the technology changed, CDs, and videos. Prices for videotapes were discounted as much as 50%.

The store was also known for its deep catalogue, eclectic selection of imported recordings, time specials, and ever-changing stock of deleted or cut out stock. Some of the walls bore autographs and photographs of various musicians and celebrities (among them Elton John, Iggy Pop, Bruce Springsteen, Liberace, Tony Bennett, Charles Aznavour) who had visited the store. There were in-store appearances (Radiohead, Meat Loaf) and, in the later years, in-store performances by various musical artists (Gordon Lightfoot, Blue Rodeo, Daniel Lanois, Saga, Don Ross, Mojo Nixon and Skid Roper, Luka Bloom, Los Lobos). T-shirts and later a complete line of "Sam's Wear" were available for customers to purchase.

The chain stores were early promoters of Canadian artists, because they prominently featured their work with in-store displays, and concerts. Well-known Canadian artists like Loreena McKennitt, Barenaked Ladies, k d lang, Cowboy Junkies, and Ron Sexsmith had their first recordings stocked or consigned at the Yonge Street flagship store, then later throughout the chain. Sam Sniderman played a role in getting the Canadian Radio-television and Telecommunications Commission (CRTC) to implement Canadian content (Can-con) regulations for radio stations in the early 1970s. The move to Can-con allowed many Canadian musicians to gain a voice in their own country. In addition to stocking (and later purchasing) the complete catalogue of the Canadian Talent Library broadcast music (see entries for Chad Allan, Jackie Mittoo, Dr. Music, Peter Appleyard), the flagship store also received copies of every LP record released in Quebec, making it the best source for French Canadian recordings outside of the province of Quebec.

In the late 1960s, Sniderman expanded the business with franchise and corporate stores in Toronto and elsewhere. The expanded business was called Roblan Distributors (named for Sam Sniderman's son Robert and Sid Sniderman's daughter Lana (d. August 2012)) and conducted business at the store level as Sam the Record Man. Some stores were not full franchises but used Roblan Distributors as their principal rack jobber and were known as RD 2000 stores. A warehouse to service the franchises and flagship store was established at 110 Bond Street incorporating the accounting and head offices which had previously been located at Yonge Street. It later moved to much larger facilities at 274 Church Street. This building was demolished and became a parking lot in the late 1990s after record companies agreed to direct ship orders to the franchise stores, thus rendering the need for a central warehouse redundant. (Previous to this the record companies would ship at no cost only to a few designated locations and that with a minimum order value.) The accounting, offices, and some warehousing facilities were moved back to 110 Bond Street, but closed when the chain filed for bankruptcy. Both properties were sold to Ryerson University along with the Yonge Street properties in January 2008.

The chain subsequently expanded to 130 stores (including RD2000 stores) across Canada, before the recorded music and media business started to decline in the 1990s. At one time, the chain was the leading music retailer in Canada.

The chain published a free music magazine (Network) in the late 1980s. One of the features in the magazine was a picture of a commissioned work of art (painting, collage, sculpture) by a local artist (among them Mendelson Joe and Kurt Swinghammer) depicting the store or brand. Some of these graphics were displayed in light boxes installed throughout the store or as the graphics for "Sam's Wear".

== 2001 bankruptcy ==
The last remaining Sam the Record Man location, at the Quinte Mall in Belleville, Ontario

In 2001, tough competition, narrow margins, and the availability of free music downloads from the Internet, forced the chain to declare bankruptcy. Most of its 30 corporate-owned stores closed. The Sniderman family was underwriting the chain's debt of $15 million for the previous five years and finally could not continue to lose money. Under new management, Sam Sniderman's sons Jason and Bobby Sniderman reopened the Yonge Street store in 2002, along with 11 franchise stores outside of Toronto. The franchise stores were not a part of the bankruptcy filing, but the corporate stores were. Eventually, all but one of the corporate stores closed. The last corporate store, in Halifax, Nova Scotia, was shut down on February 20, 2007.

== Yonge Street flagship store closes ==
On May 29, 2007, Jason and Bobby Sniderman announced that the iconic flagship store, on Toronto's Yonge and Gould Streets, would close permanently on June 30, 2007. They stated that "their decision reflects the increasing impact of technology on the record industry." There was also increasing pressure to rent out some of the property or sell it to Ryerson University, known today as Toronto Metropolitan University.

On May 30, 2007, supporters started a Facebook group to save the store's neon spinning record signs titled "Save the Sam's Sign!!!". The group, and its attached online petition, garnered over 18,000 members. On June 14, 2007, it was announced that the signage, fixtures, and memorabilia from the store, would be auctioned on June 27. The remaining stock was reduced to sell but was not sold at the auction.

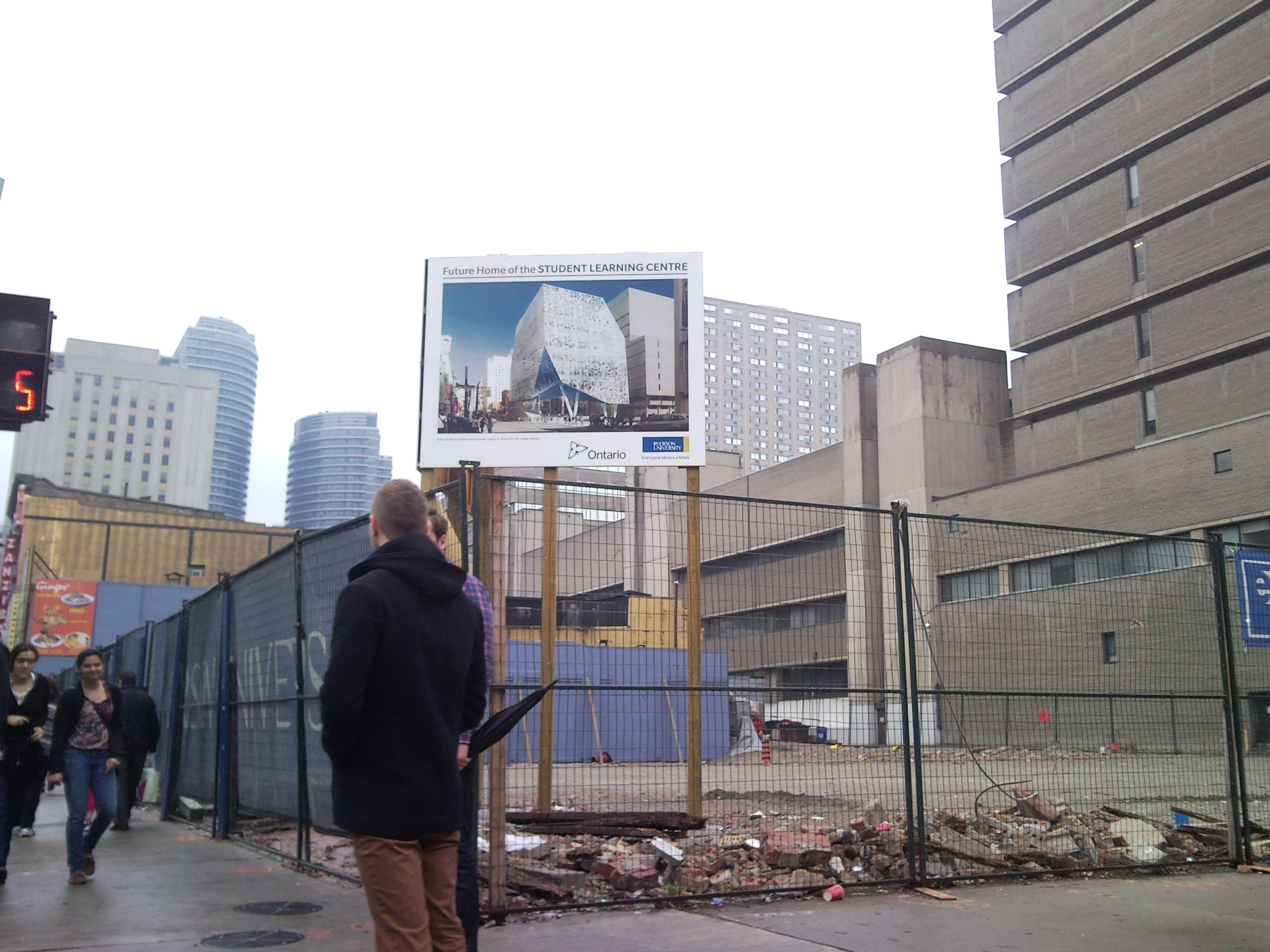
The corner of Yonge & Gould St. as of 2012.

The site at 347 Yonge Street was valuable property and was purchased by Ryerson University in 2008. The site sat vacant for several months before the spinning records were lit again for Nuit Blanche on October 4, 2008. The removal of the signage commenced shortly thereafter, and the building was demolished in 2010.

In 2014, it was announced that the landmark sign would be placed at Yonge-Dundas Square (now Sankofa Square). The new Ryerson Student Learning Centre (SLC) opened on February 23, 2015, on the old Sam's site.

The closing of the flagship left two franchise stores in operation, one in Sarnia and one in Belleville. The Sarnia store closed in 2009; the Belleville store remains open.

== Sign preservation at Yonge-Dundas Square ==
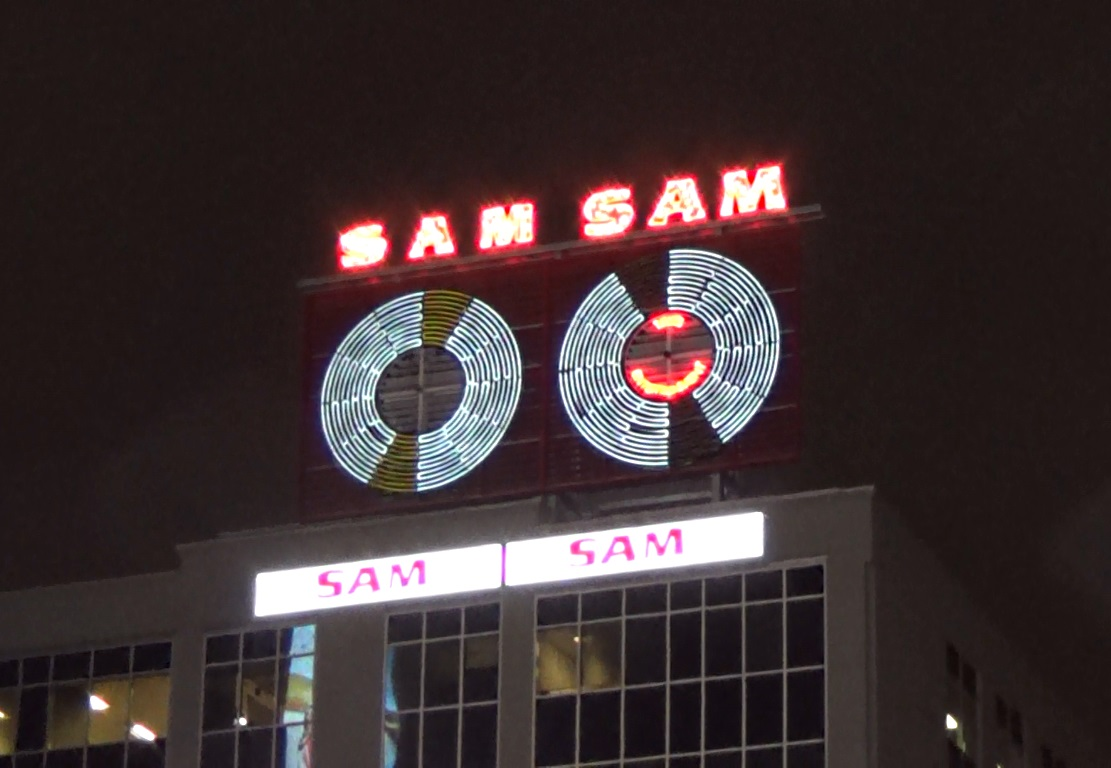
The neon spinning records and storefront signage preserved at Yonge-Dundas Square

Under a heritage preservation deal with the city, Ryerson University was expected to restore the spinning record signs and incorporate them into the new Student Learning Centre on the former Sam's site. However, the university later stated that the signs were not compatible with their designs for the new building. In July 2014, city council approved a revised agreement with Ryerson, whereby the university would pay to install and maintain the sign atop a city-owned building at 277 Victoria St., two blocks southeast of the original location.

In July 2017, Ryerson announced that restoration of the almost half-century-old neon signs had commenced, and that they would be ready for display in the autumn. The re-installation was completed, and the sign has been relit since 2018.
