= Urma (band) =

Alternative band from Romania

- Origin: Cluj-Napoca, Romania
- Genres: Alternative rock
- Years active: 2003–present
- Labels: Catapulta Records (current); Macondo Media
- Members: Mani Gutău - vocals, guitar Mihai Moldoveanu - bass Luis Palomino - saxophone, flute
- Website: Official site

Urma is an alternative band from Cluj-Napoca, Transylvania, Romania. The band was formed in spring of 2003.

Their music would be described mostly as acoustic rock, with using many types of instruments (such as flute, saxophone and strings). All the lyrics are written in English.

The band has gained popularity in many countries of Central and Western Europe; they have toured in Germany, France, Switzerland and England.

== History ==
Initially, Urma was formed by two musicians, Mani Gutău and Dan "Byron" Radu. They had met in Cluj and decided to create a new project. Soon afterwards two other musicians, Dominic Csergö and Sorin Erhan, joined the band, and they started work in the studio.

The first album, Nomad Rhymes, was released on December 10, 2004. Two years later, in 2005, followed the second album, Anger As a Gift. The title, in Mani's words, reflects the content of Urma's music: "In the world, seems defective, wonderful things are still going on. And anger, caused by lack of normal existence can be the major ingredient of a good thing. It doesn't criticize, but changes. For example. As an alternative."

In 2006, Dan Byron left the band to start his own project, called byron. In spite of it Urma has released the third album, Trend Off, that's available on iTunes now. After release, the band took a break in its activity and appeared on scene again in 2009, with the new composition.

== Band members ==
=== Current members ===
- Mani Gutău - vocals, guitar (2003–present)
- Mihai Moldoveanu - bass (2015-2016, 2018–present)
- Luis Angel Palomino - saxophone, flute (2009–present)

=== Former members ===
- Dominic Csergö - drums (2003-2016, 2018–2021)
- Cotrus Vlad - electric guitar (2016-2023)
- Dan Byron - vocals, guitar, flute (2003-2006)
- Catrinel Bejenariu - vocals (2009-2011)
- Sorin Erhan - bass (2003-2008, 2009-2014)
- Jimmy Cserkesz - guitar (2009-2015)
- Ati Panaitescu - percussion (2009-2012)
- Eduard Târâș - bass (2017 - 2018)
- Marius "Ciupi" Ciupitu - drums (2017-2018)
- Sebastian Burneci - trumpet (2013-2019)

== Discography ==
=== Studio albums ===
- Nomad Rhymes (2004)
- Anger As a Gift (2005)
- Trend Off (2007)
- Lost End Found (2013)
