= Partizan (band) =

Romanian rock band

Background information
- Origin: Bucharest, Romania
- Genres: Alternative rock • post-punk • industrial rock • electronic rock
- Years active: 2001–2004, reunited in 2011 and again in 2020s
- Label: Cat Music
- Members: Răzvan Moldovan; Andrei Bărbulescu; Adrian Agheniței
- Past members: Adrian Plesca; Vali Neamțu; Vasile Malic; Cristian Sandu; Dan Mușetescu

Partizan is a Romanian rock band first formed in Bucharest in 2001. The two core members of the band were vocalist Adrian Pleșca ("Artan") and guitarist Răzvan Moldovan ("Suedezu"), who founded Timpuri Noi in the 1980s. Partizan's early albums included Am cu ce (2002), featuring the hit song "Fata mea" (My Girl), and București (2003), a concept album about a dystopian Bucharest that was inspired by the Blade Runner and Terminator films. The group split up twice, including once in 2004, reuniting in the 2020s to record another album, Nori peste Sălăjan (Clouds over Sălăjan) (2025), released through Electrecord. Partizan's style has been characterised as post-punk in structure, with industrial dance rhythms, funk influences, and textures of electronic rock.

== History ==
According to Răzvan "Suedezu" Moldovan, the original idea behind Partizan was to combine rhythms of rock music with Romanian manele. The initial line-up was made up of former Timpuri noi members Adrian Pleșca, Răzvan Moldovan, Cătălin Neagu and Florin Barbu, with the latter two leaving the band by 2002.

The band has recorded two studio albums, one single and has made three music videos with a line up consisting of Adrian Pleșca, Răzvan Moldovan, Vali Neamțu (ex-Iris), Cristian Sandu (ex-Krypton), Vasile Malic and Dan Mușetescu. One of the music videos, for the song Dușmănia, was never aired on television, however the other two videos (for the songs Fata mea and Banii) received airplay on Romanian music televisions. "Fata mea" was one of the Romanian hit songs of 2002.

Partizan split up in 2004 when Adrian Pleșca decided to reform his old band, Timpuri Noi. However, in 2011, after a seven-year hiatus, the band returned to an active status. In 2013, the band performed at the B'estfest Summer Camp festival.

Pleșca died on 2 December 2025 of a stroke.

== Reception ==
Metalfan ranked Nori peste Sălăjan as one of its top 10 Romanian albums of the year, calling it "a manifesto of the free spirit, with soul, with an authentic attitude" ("un manifest al spiritului liber, cu suflet, cu atitudine autentică").

== Discography ==
=== Studio albums ===
- Am cu ce (2002)
- București (2003)
- Nori peste Sălăjan (2025)

=== Singles ===
- Păpușea masculină (2003)

=== Music videos ===
- Fata mea (2002)
- Banii (2002)
- Dușmănia (2002, unreleased)
