= Talitha Qumi =

Romanian progressive rock band

Talitha Qumi was a Romanian progressive folk rock band which previously performed in studio and live during the 1990s, best known for their 1995 studio album Despre cuvinte (i.e. About words). They were signed with Soft Records back during the time when they were still musically active. The band recorded their first and last studio album in 1996. The band broke up shortly afterwards, more specifically in 1997.
