= Timpuri Noi =

Romanian alternative rock band

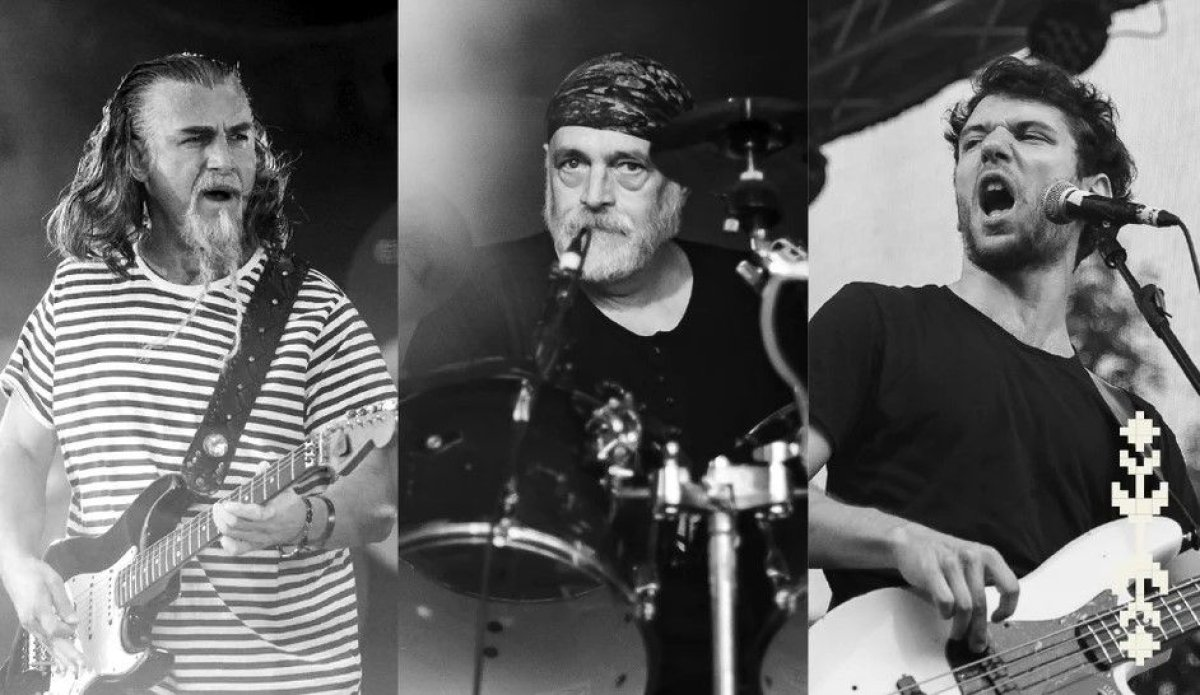

Background information
- Origin: Bucharest, Romania
- Genres: alternative rock; funk rock; post-punk (early); new wave (early); punk rock; reggae rock
- Years active: 1980—present
- Labels: MediaPro Music, VIVO
- Members: Dan Iliescu; Felix Sfura; Vlad Apotrosoaei

Timpuri Noi is a Romanian alternative rock band.

== History ==
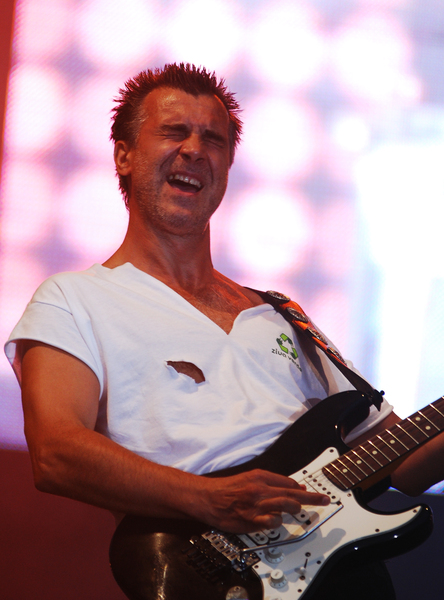
Dan Iliescu (2008)

Timpuri Noi was formed in 1980, and remained an underground act up until 1989 when a split album with the Contrast group was released (n.11 of the Formatii Rock series). This was mainly due to what was perceived as "subversive lyrical content" in the Ceauşescu era. Incidentally, the name derives from a cliché of the period: its literal meaning is "New Times" (in the sense of "New Age"), used to signify Marxist Socialism. The tongue-in-cheek reference is somehow associated with the Bucharest metro station of the same name (see: Timpuri Noi). The name is also the Romanian translation of Modern Times, the title for Charles Chaplin's classic 1936 film.

In the early nineties, up to around 1995, the band was arguably the top Romanian act. Around the time, they had the opportunity to be the opening act for rather prestigious (albeit musically different) foreign acts during concerts in Bucharest: Ian Gillan and Uriah Heep in 1992, Scorpions in 1993, Saxon, Paradise Lost and Jethro Tull in 1994, Iron Maiden and Kreator in 1995, Eros Ramazzotti, Joe Cocker and Rod Stewart later in the same year.

1994 also signified an important event in both Timpuri Noi's career and Romanian music in general: Timpuri Noi gives the very first unplugged performance in this country, recorded as an album in the same year (see below).

In 1997, the band was presented with one of the MCM French music television and Radio France Internationale "Decouvertes de Rock a l'Est" (Eastern European New Acts) Awards, performing in a special gala concert. (The previous year, Timpuri Noi had been interviewed for MTV Europe during the Golden Stag Festival in the Romanian city of Braşov.)

The band split in 2001, with members becoming involved in personal projects - Partizan for Artan, ZIDD (sometimes mentioned as "Zid" - Romanian for "wall") for Dan Iliescu. These projects were short-lived, since Timpuri noi re-united in 2005, releasing a new record called "Back in Business". In 2009, Artan leaves the group, due to disagreements with Dan Iliescu.

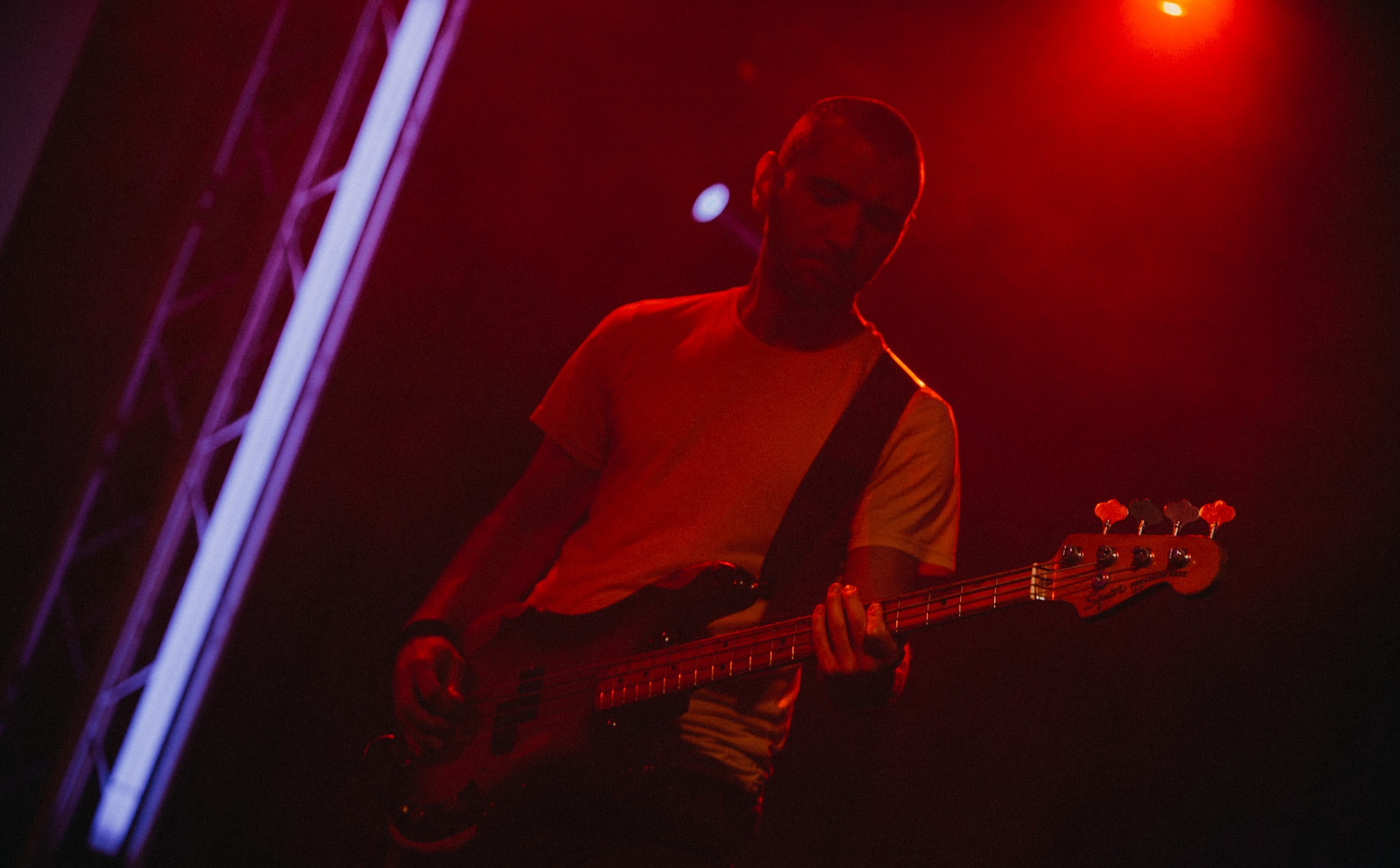
Vlad Apotrosoaei

As of 2020, the group is still active, playing live sporadically throughout the country. They released a new full-length called "Moldova Mon Amour".

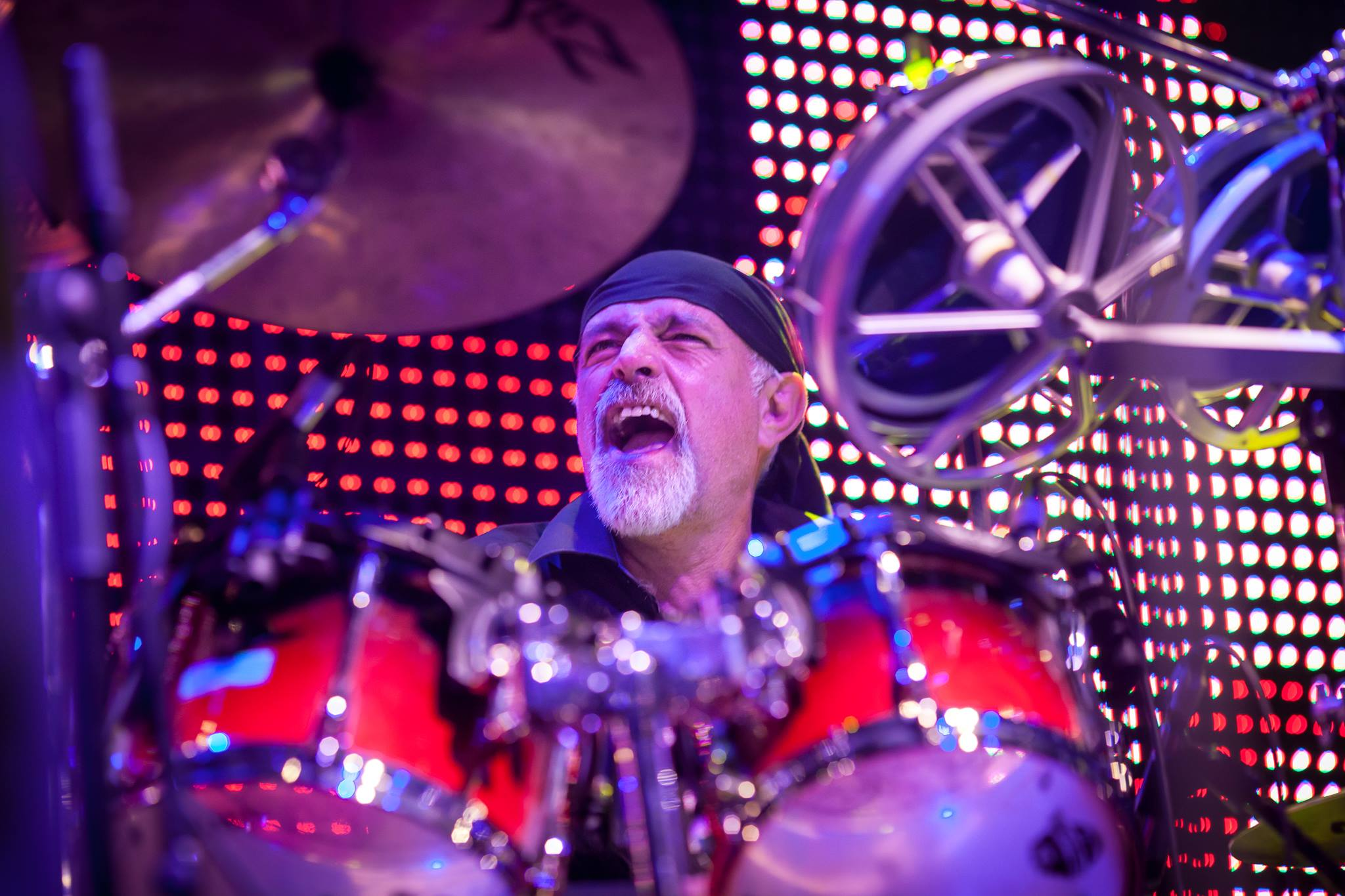
Felix Sfura

== Lineup ==
=== Band members ===
- Dan Iliescu – guitar and vocals
- Vlad Apotrosoaei – bass guitar, backing vocals
- Felix Sfura – drums and percussion, backing vocals

=== Other band members over the years ===
- 1984-2000, 2005-2009: Adrian Plesca (Artan) -lead vocals
- 1984-1990: Răzvan Moldovan -drums
- 1982: Sorin Petroianu – guitar
- 1982: Sorin Tirichiţă – bass guitar
- 1984 – 1985, 1990: Marian Ionescu – bass guitar
- 1984 – 1985, 1990: Luminita Mihaescu – keyboards, vocals
- 1986 – 1988, 1990: Radu Cartianu – bass guitar
- 1983, 1990 – 1991: Sorin (Croco) Badea – bass guitar
- 1991: Marian Mihăilescu – bass guitar
- 1991: Costel Joiţa – drums
- 1992 – 2001: Cătălin Neagu – drums
- 1992 – 1995: Marian Moldoveanu – guitar
- 1992 – 1998: Adrian Borțun – bass guitar
- 1998 – 2000: Cătălin Răsvan – bass guitar
- 2000 – 2001: Florin Barbu – bass guitar
- 2005 – 2010: Silviu Sanda – bass guitar
- 2005 – 2010: Andrei Barbulescu – drums
- 2007 – 2008: Victor Rivalet – keyboards, samplers, groove machine
- 2009 – 2010: Vladimir Sateanu (Vlady) – bass guitar
- Florin Tuliga – programming
- Aurel Parocescu – samplers and drum machines

In some concerts, the band would add two backing female singers to its lineup (whether vocalists or violinists): the official site mentions Denis Iliescu, Crina Godescu and Maria Radu as its main collaborators.

== Discography ==
- Formații rock nr. 11 (Electrecord, 1989; split LP along with the band Contrast from Suceava), last 3 tracks (LP)
- Timpuri Noi (Cartianu SRL & Eurostar, 1992) (LP, MC)
- Unplugged în concert (Vivo, 1994) (CD, MC)
- De regiune superior (Vivo, 1995) (CD, MC)
- Basca abundenței (MediaPro Music, 1998) (CD, MC)
- Lucky Nights Unplugged (MediaPro Music, 2000) split, last 7 tracks (CD, MC)
- Back in Business (MediaPro Music, 2006) (CD, MC)
- Ediție specială – Live in Studio (self-produced/promo, 2010) (CD)
- Deschide-ți mintea! (MHO Marketing Highest Option, 2012) (CD)
- Moldova mon amour (Luna PR & Events, 2020) (CD)
