= A&A Records =

Defunct Canadian record store chain

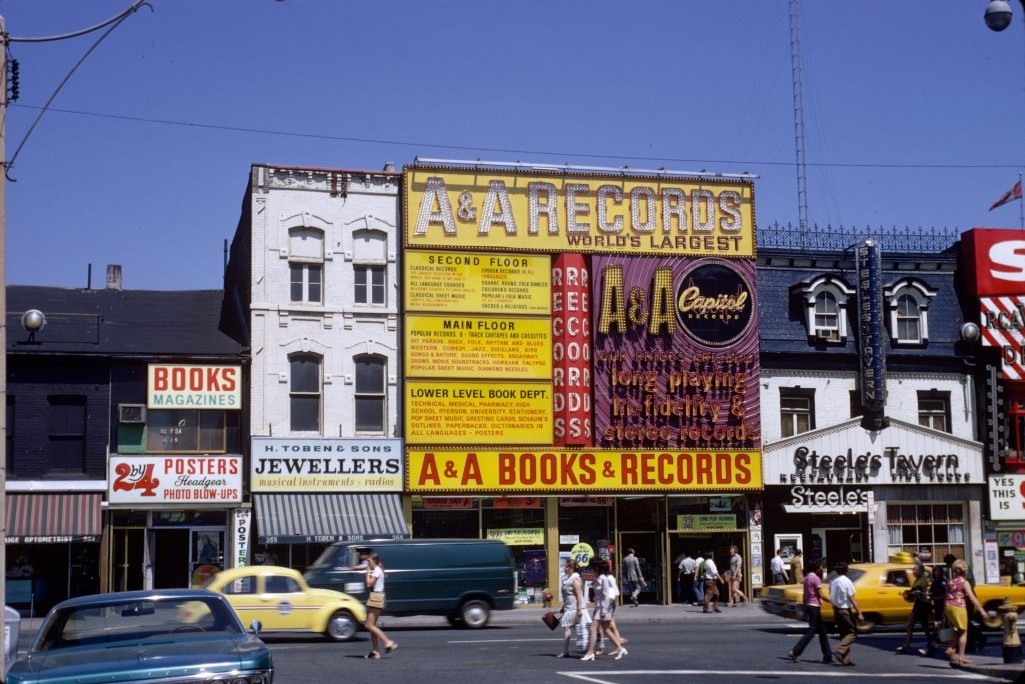
A&A Records at 351 Yonge Street in Toronto, circa 1975

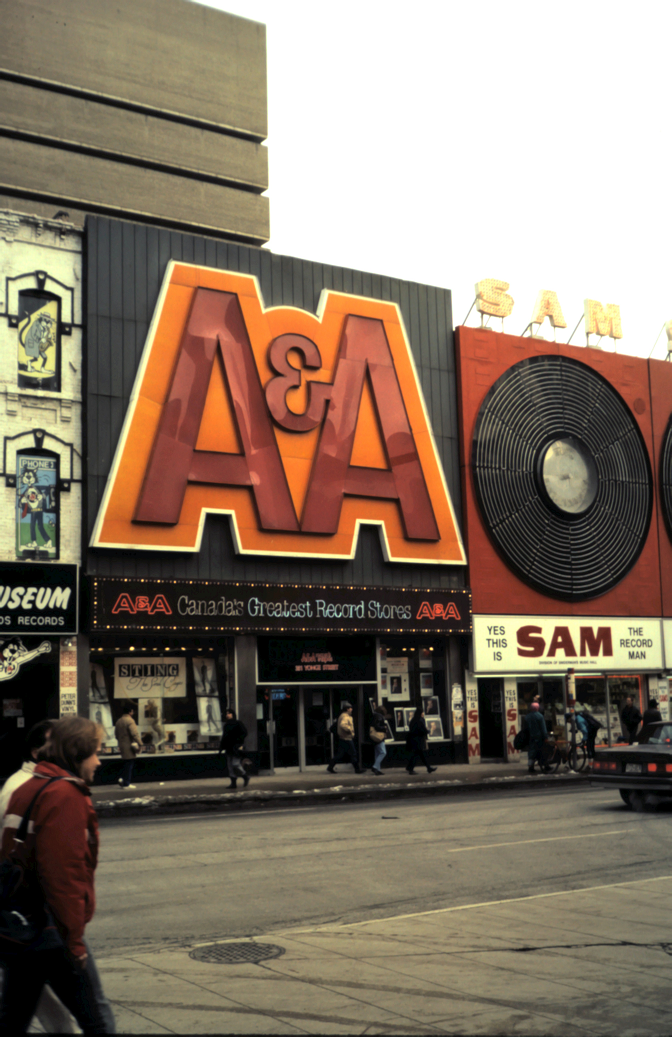
The A&A flagship store in the early 1990s; A&A's main rival's flagship store can be seen right next door.

A&A Records was a Canadian record store chain, active from 1946 to 1993. Prior to the expansion of Sam the Record Man in the early 1960s, A&A was the dominant record store chain in Canada.

It was acquired by CBS Records after it lost the dominant market position to the Sam's chain, but was reacquired by a Toronto investment group in 1981.

After attempting to rapidly expand their scope of operations in the late 1980s and early 90s, A&A Records filed for bankruptcy in 1993, shutting down all stores.

== History ==
The A&A bookstore was founded in 1946 by Alice Kenner and her husband Mac, with the assistance of her brother Aaron as A&A Bookstore, on Yonge Street. The name, derived from the initials of Alice's and Aaron's first names, was chosen "so we'd be listed first in the Yellow Pages." The family also founded the A&A Lunchroom in the same building.

In the early 1950s, the store added a record section to sell LP records which were gaining in popularity among young people. Within a few years, record sales became the dominant portion of the store's business. In 1960, A&A Books & Records Company of Canada licensed several franchises across Canada and in 1971, the Kenners sold the business to CBS Records.

In 1974, its operations consisted of the main store at 351 Yonge Street in Toronto, another flagship store on rue Sainte-Catherine in Montreal and six franchise stores in Ontario. The company also had two wholly owned subsidiaries: Glen Music, which had four stores in Alberta, and Glen Music Western, which had six stores in British Columbia.

By the end of 1974, the company decided to close its book business that was located in the basement floor of its flagship store at 351 Yonge Street, Toronto. The senior management consisted of general manager Rick McGraw and vice-president of marketing R. Bruce Wilson. Its offices were located above the retail store at 351 Yonge Street, in a small portion of the second and third floor. The second floor was classical department and the third floor was being used as the warehouse. The company itself was a wholly owned subsidiary of Columbia Records Canada.

In the spring of 1975, the accounting office was relocated to 75 The Donway West, while the management offices remained at 351 Yonge Street.

In 1981 CBS sold its retail and wholesale pre-recorded music business to some of its former executives - Terry Lynd, Fred Rich and Dick Moody, who took over the company as Chairman, President and Executive Vice-President respectively and collectively held majority ownership. The corporate name under the new ownership was Sound Insight Limited, while retail stores kept the trade name A&A Records and Tapes, and later A&A Music & Entertainment.

Between 1981 and 1987, the company made several acquisitions including the purchase of Flipside retail chain from Polydor Records.

In 1987 the company reported its best financial results - sales of $134 million and net income of over $7 million. That same year, Sound Insight was purchased by a group of Canadian and US investors and became a wholly owned subsidiary of Vector No. Acquisition Corporation. The company's operations had previously been confined to fewer than forty stores, but during this period the company went through a period of rapid expansion, opening almost 100 new retail stores during 1989 alone.

By 1990, A&A had 260 retail stores across Canada, twice as many as their chief competitor Sam the Record Man, and had a presence in every province. The company's sudden expansion, however, proved to be its undoing: many of the new locations were opened with no cohesive marketing strategy, and almost all of the new locations proved to be unprofitable and unsustainable.

During peak Christmas season in 1990, company's sales were $400,000 to $600,000 below breakeven. Senior management discussed several options to stabilize the business. After staggering through two further unprofitable years, it was decided that CCAA filing was the only viable option.

The corporation declared bankruptcy in January 1991, and announced a restructuring plan that would see the closure of up to 50 stores. In March of the same year, it was reported that Lincoln Capital Corporation had purchased a 70 per cent stake in A&A.

== Bankruptcy ==
The chain—having shed most of their unprofitable stores—emerged from bankruptcy under the ownership of Lincoln Capital Corporation. However, the corporation again filed for bankruptcy later in 1993, and was dissolved when its assets were sold piecemeal. Its remaining retail outlets were absorbed by other retailers, with many of the remaining A&A stores being absorbed into the Music World or Sunrise Records chains.

In December 1993, the flagship Yonge Street store became a Future Shop, which later relocated to the nearby 10 Dundas East complex. The location was sold to Toronto Metropolitan University, and the building torn down in 2010, along with A&A's former rival - the nearby Sam the Record Man flagship store. The site now houses TMU's Sheldon & Tracy Levy Student Learning Centre.

== See also ==
- Sam the Record Man
