= European Festival Awards =

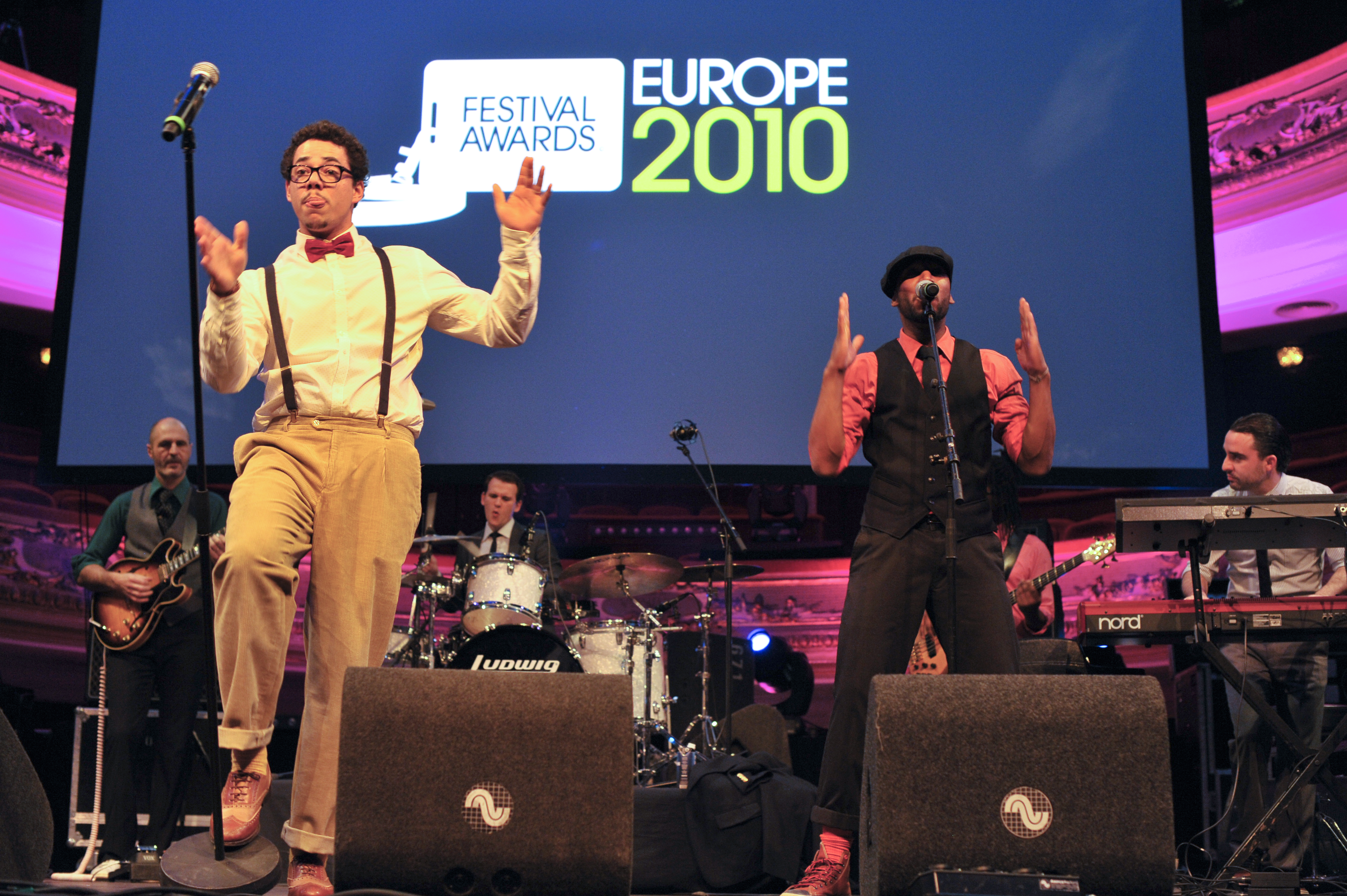
Ben l'Oncle Soul at the European Festival Awards 2010 - by André van der Veen

The European Festival Awards were initiated in 2010 by the European festival association Yourope and the festival website Virtual Festivals Europe. The awards are presented annually in January of the following year at the European music conference and showcase festival Eurosonic Noorderslag in Groningen, The Netherlands. The European Festival Awards are aimed at European Festivals and their organizations, who make an important contribution to society. There are awards in 13 categories such as “Best big European festival” and “Best European festival line-up”.

== Winners of the European Festival Awards ==
=== 2019 ===
Best Major Festival	Best Medium-Sized Festival
(Poland) Open'er Festival: (Serbia) Exit; (Austria) FM4 Frequency Festival; (France) Hellfest; (Germany) Lollapalooza Berlin; (Netherlands) Lowlands; (Austria) Nova Rock Festival; (Belgium) Pukkelpop; (Belgium) Rock Werchter; (Hungary) Sziget Festival	(Romania) Electric Castle: (Hungary) Balaton Sound; (Netherlands) Down the Rabbit Hole; (Czech Republic) Let It Roll; (Germany) Melt! Festival; (Poland) OFF Festival; (Poland) Orange Warsaw Festival; (Slovakia) Pohoda; (Montenegro) Sea Dance Festival; (France) We Love Green
Best Small Festival	Best New Festival
(Romania) Jazz in the Park: (Serbia) Arsenal Fest; (Belgium) Leffingeleuren; (Germany) Maifeld Derby; (Serbia) No Sleep Festival; (Netherlands) Roadburn Festival; (Slovakia) Sharpe Festival; (Austria) Szene Openair; (Poland) Tauron Nowa Muzyka Katowice; (Germany) Wacken Winter Nights	(Serbia) No Sleep Festival: (Portugal) Afronation; (Poland) FEST Festival; (Northern Ireland) Jika Jika; (Poland) Mystic Festival; (Germany) REVOLT
Best Indoor Festival	Line-Up of the Year
(Germany) Reeperbahn Festival: (Norway) Blues in Hell; FOCUS Wales; (Germany) Hamburg Metal Dayz; (Czech Republic) Let it Roll Winter; (Slovenia) MENT Ljubljana; (Belgium) Mithra Jazz à Liège; (Netherlands) Prognosis Festival; (Italy) Sudwave – Festival & Conference; (North Macedonia) Taksirat Festival	(United Kingdom) Glastonbury Festival: (Germany) Lollapalooza Berlin; (Netherlands) Lowlands; (Poland) Open'er Festival; (Slovakia) Pohoda; (Spain) Primavera Sound; (Belgium) Pukkelpop; (Belgium) Rock Werchter; (Hungary) Sziget Festival; (Germany) Wacken Open Air
Promoter of the Year	Agent of the Year
(Switzerland) Wepromote: (Poland) Alter Art; (United Kingdom) Festival Republic; (Germany) FKP Scorpio; (Germany) Goodlive; (Germany) MCT Berlin; (Slovakia) Pohoda; (Spain) Primavera Sound; (Finland) Ruisrock; (Germany) Wacken ICS	Lucy Dickins (WME): Alex Bruford (ATC Live); Angus Baskerville (13 Artists); Ian Huffam (X-Ray Touring); Kiki Ressler (KKT); Maria May (CAA); Mike Malak (Paradigm); Natasha Bent (Paradigm); Paul Wilson (CAA); Rob Challice (Paradigm)
The Award for Excellence & Passion	The Brand Activation Award
(Romania) Codruta Vulcu: (United Kingdom) Alex Hardee; (United Kingdom) Barrie Marshall; (United Kingdom) Ben Challis; (Switzerland) Daniel Fontana; (Netherlands) Eric van Eerdenburg; (Germany) Folkert Koopmans; (Germany) Holger Jan Schmidt; (Netherlands) Kim Bloem; (Poland) Mikołaj Ziółkowski	(Poland) Open'er Festival and Netflix: Stranger Things: (Netherlands) Lowlands and Rabobank: Brasserie 2050; (Norway) Øyafestivalen and Fortum: The Green Rider; (Hungary) Sziget Festival and IBIS: IBIS Music; (Romania) Untold and KFC: Haunted Camping; (France) We Love Green and Back Market: Back Market x We Love Green Circular
The Take a Stand Award	The Green Operations Award
(Germany) Das Fest: (Romania) AWAKE; (Czech Republic) Festival Svobody; (Germany) Orange Blossom; (Poland) Pol'and'Rock Festival	(Switzerland) Open Air St. Gallen: (Romania) Electric Castle; (Norway) Øyafestivalen; (Spain) PortAmérica; (Denmark) Roskilde Festival; (France) We Love Green
The Health & Safety Innovation Award	Newcomer of the Year
(Hungary) Balaton Sound: (Germany) Happiness Festival; (Slovakia) Pohoda; (Germany) Wat en Schlick Festival	Billie Eilish: Black Midi; Fontaines D.C.; Idles; Jessie Reyez; Lizzo; Rosalía; Sam Fender; Sea Girls; Slowthai
Lifetime Achievement Award
Holger Hübner and Thomas Jensen (Wacken Open Air)

=== 2018 ===
Best Major Festival	Best Medium-Sized Festival
(Germany) Wacken Open Air: (Czech Republic) Colours of Ostrava; (France) Hellfest; (Netherlands) Lowlands; (Poland) Open'er Festival; (Netherlands) Pinkpop; (Belgium) Rock Werchter; (Denmark) Roskilde Festival; (Hungary) Sziget Festival; (Belgium) Tomorrowland	(Denmark) NorthSide Festival: (Romania) AWAKE; (Romania) Electric Castle; (Germany) Happiness Festival; (Netherlands) North Sea Jazz; (Poland) OFF Festival; (Norway) Øyafestivalen; (Germany) Reeperbahn Festival; (Germany) Reload Festival; (Montenegro) Sea Dance Festival
Best Small Festival	Best New Festival
(Romania) Artmania Festival: (Hungary) LB27 Reggae Camp; (Germany) Metal Hammer Paradise; (Czech Republic) Mladí Ladí Jazz; (Portugal) OUT.FEST; (Kosovo) PULS Festival; (Poland) Tauron Nowa Muzyka Katowice; (Germany) / (Hungary) Telekom Electronic Beats Festival; (Germany) Wacken Winter Nights; (Italy) Ypsigrock Festival	(Germany) Rolling Stone Park: (United Kingdom) Arcadia London; (Georgia (country)) EchoWaves; (Bosnia and Herzegovina) Festival 84; (Spain) Full Metal Holiday; Garden; (Netherlands) Neverland Festival; (France) Stereoparc; (Germany) The Monastery; (Germany) Werner Rennen
Best Indoor Festival	Line-Up of the Year
(Spain) WOS Festival x SON Estrella Galicia: (Germany) Autumn Moon Festival; (Germany) c/o pop Festival; (Germany) Metal Hammer Paradise; (Czech Republic) Mladí Ladí Jazz; (Kosovo) PULS Festival; (Germany) Rolling Stone Park; (Germany) Rolling Stone Weekender; (Austria) Waves Vienna; (Germany) WinterWorld	(Denmark) Roskilde Festival: (Belgium) Graspop Metal Meeting; (France) Hellfest; (Netherlands) Lowlands; (Spain) Mad Cool Festival; (Poland) Open'er Festival; (Switzerland) Open Air St. Gallen; (Netherlands) Pinkpop; (Spain) Primavera Sound; (Belgium) Rock Werchter
Promoter of the Year	Agent of the Year
(Netherlands) Mojo: (Poland) Alter Art; (Austria) Barracuda; (Denmark) Down the Drain; (Germany) FKP Scorpio; (Sweden) Luger; (Denmark) Roskilde Festival; (Finland) Ruisrock; (Germany) Wacken ICS; (Switzerland) Wepromote	Mike Greek (CAA): Alex Hardee (Coda Music Agency); Angus Baskerville (13 Artists); Clementine Bunel (Coda Music Agency); Emma Banks (CAA); Isla Angus (ATC Live); Josh Javor (X-Ray Touring); Paul Wilson (CAA); Rob Challice (Coda Music Agency); Steve Zapp (ITB)
The Award for Excellence & Passion	The Brand Activation Award
(Slovakia) Michal Kaščák: (United Kingdom) Ben Challis; (United Kingdom) Chris Tofu; (Netherlands) Eric van Eerdenburg; (Spain) Gabi Ruiz; (Germany) Holger Jan Schmidt; (Serbia) Ivan Milivojev; (France) Jean-Louis Brossard; (Germany) Philippe Cornu; (Germany) Stefan Lehmkuhl	(Finland) Ruisrock and Fortum: (Denmark) Haven Festival and IKEA; (Poland) Open'er Festival and Mastercard; (Switzerland) Paléo Festival and HES-SO; (Hungary) Sziget Festival and Magyar Telekom; (Romania) Untold Festival and Coca-Cola
The Take a Stand Award	The Green Operations Award
(Slovakia) Pohoda: (Romania) Artmania Festival and EEMC; (Romania) AWAKE; (Hungary) Bánkitó Festival; (Serbia) EXIT; (United Kingdom) Greenbelt Festival	(Netherlands) DGTL Amsterdam: (Portugal) EDP Cooljazz; (United Kingdom) Green Gathering; (Denmark) NorthSide Festival; (Belgium) Paradise City; (France) We Love Green
The Health & Safety Innovation Award	Newcomer of the Year
(Denmark) Roskilde Festival: (Netherlands) Lowlands; (Switzerland) Open Air St. Gallen; (Netherlands) Pinkpop; (Finland) Ruisrock; (Germany) Reload Festival	Greta Van Fleet: Alma; Brockhampton; Idles; Jorja Smith; Parcels; Sigrid; Superorganism; Yungblud; Zeal & Ardor
Lifetime Achievement Award
Peter Smidt

=== 2017 ===
Category	Winner	Country
Best Major Festival	EXIT	Serbia
Best Medium-Sized Festival	Down the Rabbit Hole	The Netherlands
Best Small Festival	MENT Ljubljana	Slovenia
Best New Festival	Wacken Winter Nights	Germany
Best Indoor Festival	MENT Ljubljana	Slovenia
Best Line-Up	Sziget Festival	Hungary
Newcomer of the Year	Rag'n'Bone Man	United Kingdom
Green Operations Award	Pohoda	Slovakia
Promoter of the Year	Goodlive	Germany
Lifetime Achievement Award	Daniel Rossellat	Switzerland
Excellence And Passion Award	Fruzsina Szép	Hungary
Agent of the Year	Alex Bruford (ATC Live)	United Kingdom
The Brand Activation Award	The Miele Powerwash at Lowlands	The Netherlands
The Health and Safety Innovation Award	Paléo Festival Nyon & Roskilde Festival	Switzerland & Denmark
The Take a Stand Award	Roskilde Festival	Denmark

=== 2016 ===
Category	Winner	Country
Best Major Festival	Rock Werchter	Belgium

=== 2015 ===
Category	Winner	Country
Best Major Festival	Untold festival	Romania
Best Medium-Sized Festival	Telekom Volt festival	Hungary
Best Small Festival	Happiness festival	Germany
Best New Festival	Lollapalooza Berlin	Germany
Best Indoor Festival	Les Transardentes	Belgium
Best Line-Up	Sziget Festival	Hungary
Newcomer of the Year	Hozier	Ireland
Best Headliner	The Prodigy	United Kingdom
Festival Anthem of the Year	Lean On (Major Lazer)	United Kingdom
Green Operations Award	Tollwood Festival	Germany
Artist's Favourite Festival	Rock Werchter	Belgium
Promoter of the Year	Hörstmann unternehmensgruppe	Germany
Lifetime Achievement Award	Jean-Louis Brossard and Béatrice Macé (Rencontres Trans Musicales)	France
Excellence And Passion Award	Chris Kemp	United Kingdom
Emma Banks (CAA)|United Kingdom
Das Fest|Germany

=== 2014 ===
Category	Winner	Country
Best Major Festival	Sziget Festival	Hungary
Best Medium-Sized European Festival	Sea Dance Festival	Montenegro
Best Small European Festival	Festival Tauron Nowa Muzyka	Poland
Best New Festival	Down The Rabbit Hole	The Netherlands
Best Indoor Festival	I Love Techno	Belgium
Best European Festival Line-Up	Glastonbury Festival	United Kingdom
Newcomer of the Year	Stromae	Belgium
Headliner of the Year	Arctic Monkeys	United Kingdom
Festival Anthem of the Year	R U Mine (Arctic Monkeys)	United Kingdom
Green Operations Award	Roskilde Festival	Denmark
The Health & Safety Innovation Award	MOJO/LOC Festivals	The Netherlands
Artist's Favourite European Festival	Primavera Sound	Spain
Promoter of the Year	Live Nation	Belgium
Lifetime Achievement Award	Melvin Benn	United Kingdom
The Award for Excellence And Passion	Rikke Øxner	Denmark

=== 2013 ===
Category	Winner	Country
Best Major European Festival	EXIT	Serbia
Best Medium-Sized European Festival	Melt!	Germany
Best Small European Festival	Fusion Festival	Romania
Best New Festival	B.my.Lake	Hungary
Best Indoor Festival	Metal Hammer Paradise	Germany
Best European Festival Line-Up	Berlin Festival	Germany
Newcomer of the Year	Imagine Dragons	United States
Headliner of the Year	Arctic Monkeys	England
Festival Anthem of the Year	Get Lucky (Daft Punk)	France
The Green Operations Award In	Way Out West	Sweden
Artist's Favourite European Festival	Lowlands	Netherlands
Promoter of the Year	FKP Scorpio	Germany
Lifetime Achievement Award	Marek Lieberberg	Germany
Innovation Award	Paléo Festival	Switzerland

=== 2012 ===
Category	Winner	Country
Best Major European Festival	Tomorrowland	Belgium
Best Medium-Sized European Festival	Balaton Sound	Hungary
Best Small European Festival	Tauron New Music Festival	Poland
Best New European Festival	Electro Magnetic	Germany
Best Indoor Festival	Sensation	Netherlands
Best European Festival Line-Up	Rock am Ring and Rock im Park	Germany
Best Newcomer	Of Monsters and Men	Iceland
Best Headliner	Foo Fighters	United States
Festival Anthem of the Year	I Follow Rivers (Lykke Li)	Sweden
Yourope Green ‘N’ Clean Festival Of The Year	We Love Green	France
Artist's Favourite European Festival	Roskilde Festival	Denmark
Promoter Of The Year in association with Virtual Festivals Europe	Pukkelpop	Belgium
Yourope Lifetime Achievement Award	Herman Schueremans	Belgium

=== 2011 ===
Category	Winner	Country
Best Major European Festival	Sziget Festival	Hungary
Best Medium-Sized European Festival	Off Festival	Poland
Best Small European Festival	Haldern Pop	Germany
Best New European Festival	Extrema Outdoor	Germany
Best Indoor Festival	I Love Techno	Belgium
Best European Festival Line-Up	Rock Werchter	Belgium
Best Newcomer	James Blake	United Kingdom
Best Headliner	Coldplay	United Kingdom
Festival Anthem of the Year	Viva La Vida (Coldplay)	United Kingdom
Yourope Green ‘N’ Clean Festival Of The Year	Melt!	Germany
Artist's Favourite European Festival	Southside and Hurricane	Germany
Promoter Of The Year in association with Virtual Festivals Europe	FKP Scorpio	Germany
Yourope Lifetime Achievement Award	Michael Eavis	United Kingdom

=== 2010 ===
Category	Winner	Country
Best Major European Festival	Open'er Festival	Poland
Best Medium-Sized European Festival	Electric Picnic Music and Arts Festival	Ireland
Best Small European Festival	Tauron Nowa Muzyka Festival	Poland
Best New European Festival	Temple House Festival	Ireland
Best Indoor Festival	Rolling Stone Weekender	Germany
Best European Festival Line-Up	Oxegen	Ireland
Best Newcomer	Florence and the Machine	United Kingdom
Best Headliner	Muse	United Kingdom
Festival Anthem of the Year	Uprising (Muse)	United Kingdom
Yourope Green ‘N’ Clean Festival Of The Year	Boom Festival	Portugal
Artist's Favourite European Festival	Melt!	Germany
Promoter Of The Year in association with Virtual Festivals Europe	Kilimanjaro/K2	
Yourope Lifetime Achievement Award	Leif Skov	Denmark

=== 2009 ===
Category	Winner	Country
Best Major European Festival	Open'er Festival	Poland
Best Medium-Sized European Festival	Dour Festival	Belgium
Best Small European Festival	Cactusfestival	Belgium
Best New European Festival	Openfields Festival	Belgium
Best European Festival Line-Up	Rock Werchter	Belgium
Best Newcomer	White Lies	United Kingdom
Best Headliner	The Prodigy	United Kingdom
Festival Anthem of the Year	Viva la Vida (Coldplay)	United Kingdom
Yourope Green ‘N’ Clean Festival Of The Year	Øyafestivalen	Norway
Artist's Favourite European Festival	Rock Werchter	Belgium
Promoter Of The Year	Herman Schueremans	Belgium
Yourope Lifetime Achievement Award	Jan Smeets	Netherlands
