= Myra Monoka =

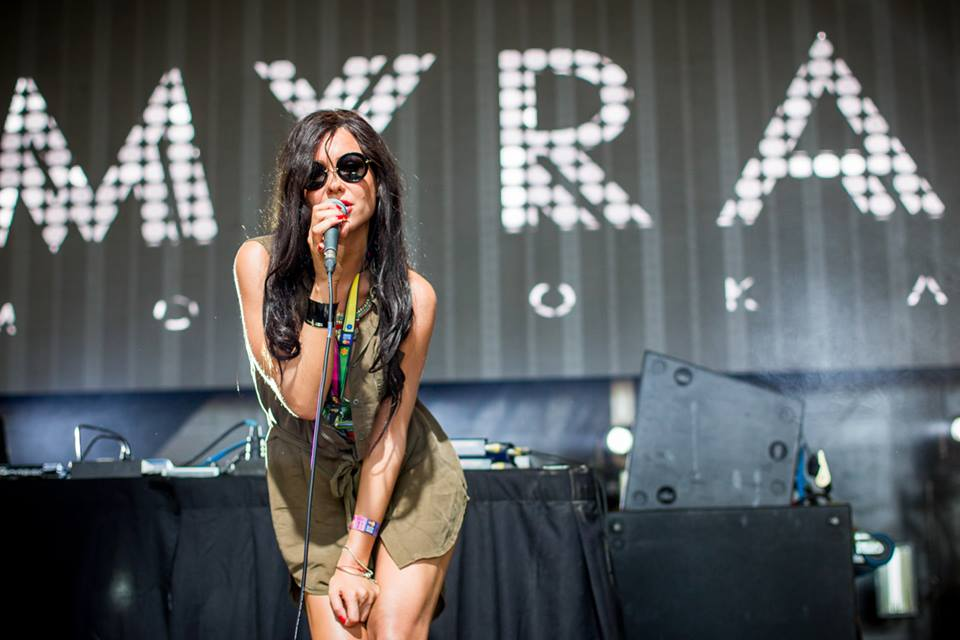
- Myra performing at Balaton Sound Festival 2015

Background information
- Also known as: Mira
- Born: Budapest, Hungary
- Occupations: singer, songwriter, producer

Myra Monoka, is an international singer and songwriter who creates soulful electronic music.

Monoka has written and sang top records such as Chris.SU feat. Mira - Together in the Night (Andy C - Nightlife 6) Remix of the year 2012, Mongoose feat. Mira - Comin Alive Best Videos of 2012 }, Soerii & Poolek - Brutalis Nyar as well as contributed to projects that have gone on to reach the top 5 on charts, such as Bogi and the Berry - Korut, Mongoose feat. Myra Monoka - Play.

== Recent achievements ==
She cowrote and sang the Hungarian hit with Willcox - Remember. The track was the most Shazamed Hungarian track for eight weeks in Hungary.

She sings the official remix song of the Hungarian superproduction (movie with a budget of 1billion HUF) called PAPPA PIA, that she created with DJ Begi Lotfi ( Petofi Award - Best DJ of the year.) The song reached the 4th place on the Hungarian MAHASZ list this month in August.

In May she reached 1st and the 11th place with “ Stereo Palma ft. Myra - Because of the Night “ on the German DJ Playlist (DDP)

This year in Hungary she received her first Platinum album for her pop song. ”Soerii&Poolek - Hurrikán”.

== Early life ==
Myra was born on 6 July 1988, in Budapest, Hungary as Eszter Nagy. Myra started playing the cello at age 6 and got accepted to the Béla Bartók Conservatory at age 13. In Miami, America, she became a sound engineer at SAE Institute and had a chance to learn from Grammy Awarded/Nominated teachers.

== Discography ==
- 2024 - Így Alakult
- 2023 - Drive
- 2022 - 6 Feet Under
- 2020 - Willcox ft. Myra Monoka - Over
- 2018 - Willcox - Remember
- 2017 - Mongoose feat. Myra Monoka - Ma Még
- 2017 - Stereo Palma feat. Myra - Because of the Night
- 2017 - Lotfi Begi feat. Myra - Pappa Pia Hivatalos Remix - Kell egy kis örültség
- 2015 - Supapowa - Myra Monoka & Mongoose - Single - AMPM
- 2015 - Me on the Rocks - Myra Monoka - Single - AMPM
- 2015 - Countdown - Myra Monoka - Single - AMPM
- 2015 - Brutalis Nyar - Soerii & Poolek - Single - Gold Record Music Kft.
- 2015 - Mesmerized - Plastic Heaven - EP - StayFly Records
- 2013 - Together in the Night feat. Mira - Chris.SU - FATE Recordings
- 2012 - Comin Alive - Mongoose feat. Mira - Power to us EP - RUNE CHILL Recordings Amazon ]
- 2012 - Higher - Chris.SU - Fate EP - Subtitles Music (UK)
