= Hultsfred Festival =

Annual music festival in Sweden

Coordinates: 57.494312°N 15.858765°E

- Genre: Pop, Alternative music, Hip Hop, Metal, Rock, World music, Electronic music, Indie music
- Dates: Mid June
- Locations: Hultsfred, Sweden
- Years active: 1986 - 2009, 2011 - 2013
- Founders: Putte Svensson, Håkan Waxegård, Per Alexanderson, Kerstin Carlsson
- Website: www.hultsfredsfestivalen.se

The Hultsfred Festival (Swedish: Hultsfredsfestivalen) was an annual music festival held in Hultsfred, Sweden. It took place at lake Hulingen for three days in June or July, from Thursday to Saturday. Since the first festival in 1986, its attendance increased from 7,500 visitors to approximately 32,000 people in 2005. With its five different stages, the Hultsfred Festival hosted many bands each year (154 in 2007) from Scandinavia and the world alike.

Due to an increase in ticket pricing and what the public recognized as a poor lineup in 2007, festival attendance had been declining. The festival went bankrupt in 2010, and the event was cancelled that year, but was resurrected in 2011.

FKP Scorpio, festival organizer since 2011, announced on 20 March 2013 that they would move the festival to Stockholm, Hultsfred goes Stockholm. On 14 April 2013 a new festival association, under the name This Is Hultsfred, announced their intention to organize a festival in Hultsfred 2013 on the traditional site. Scorpio also hosts the Bråvalla festival.

== Hultsfred goes Stockholm! ==
FKP Scorpio stages 13–15 June 2013 a festival in Sigtuna Municipality, north of Stockholm.

== This is Hultsfred ==
This is Hultsfred were working to keep the festival in Hultsfred, planned for 14–15 June 2013.

== History ==
At the 1999 festival, a 19-year-old woman died of suffocation during a concert with Hole.

In 2006, the festival booked Babyshambles, the band fronted by Pete Doherty. Because of Doherty's widely reported drug addiction, the arrangers of the festival were criticized even before the festival had begun, as the festival profiles itself as being anti-drugs. The arrangers defended the booking by saying that the band was booked for its music and not its members' personal lives. After being delayed for more than an hour, the concert took place with Doherty attacking photographers, throwing a guitar at the audience and finally falling off stage in a failed attempt at stage diving. Immediately after the concert Doherty was arrested by the Hultsfred police and fined for drug possession.

On 30 June 2010, Rockparty reported that due to bad ticket sales, Hultsfredsfestivalen AB would file for bankruptcy, and that the 25th annual Hultsfred festival would not be held. The festival made a comeback the next year, thanks to FPK Scorpio.

== Stages ==
Name	Capacity	Active	Notable bands
Hawaii	25,000	1988 -	Ozzy Osbourne, The Prodigy, The Ramones, Roxette, Oasis, Marilyn Manson, System of a Down, Slipknot, Slayer, HIM, 50 Cent, Korn, Radiohead, Rage Against the Machine, Iggy Pop, Bloodhound Gang, Pet Shop Boys, Black Sabbath, Limp Bizkit, Queens of the Stone Age, Alicia Keys, In Flames, The Killers, Kings Of Leon, Franz Ferdinand
Pampas	18,000	1994 -	Rammstein, Tori Amos, Maria McKee, Lisa Ekdahl, Caesars Palace, HIM, In Flames, Lordi, Simple Plan, The Donnas, Ice Cube, Ludacris
Atlantis	5,000	2003 -	Moneybrother, Lamb of God, Dark Tranquillity, Paramore, Jimmy Eat World, Justice, Gogol Bordello, The Embassy
Teater	1,500	1986 -	The Verve, Bullet for My Valentine, Cult of Luna, Danko Jones, Black Label Society
Stora Dans	650	1986 -	
Rookie	650	2003 -	Alice in Videoland, Dead by April

== Lineups ==
2013
Arctic Monkeys - Portishead - Fatboy Slim - Band of Horses - Phoenix - The Flaming Lips - Imagine Dragons - Mew - SBTRKT - John Talabot - Modest Mouse - Adrian Lux - Lorentz & Sakarias

2012
The Cure - The Stone Roses - The XX - Slash - Eagles Of Death Metal - Chase & Status - The Cardigans - Gorillaz Sound System - Justice - Mumford & Sons (cancelled) - Kasabian - Marina and the Diamonds - Garbage - James Blake - The Kooks - M83 - Noah and the Whale - Frank Turner - Future Islands - Stay+ - Ewert and The Two Dragons - Ikonika - Fink

2011
Morrissey - The Prodigy - Crystal Castles - Primal Scream - Beach House - Suede - MF Doom - OFWGKTA - Foster The People - White Lies - Les Savy Fav - Erasure - Duck Sauce - Raised Fist - Bootsy Collins - Nashville Pussy - Washed Out

2010 (cancelled)
Scissor Sisters - NAS & Damian Marley - Deftones - Erykah Badu - Empire of the Sun - Kent - The Hives - Thirty Seconds to Mars - Killswitch Engage - The Ting Tings - We Are Scientists

2009
Madness - The Killers - Regina Spektor - Lenka - Lars Winnerbäck (x4) - Maia Hirasawa - Timbuktu - Takida - Anna Ternheim - Kings of Leon - Franz Ferdinand - Dropkick Murphys - Ice Cube - Ludacris - Lisa Bouvier

2008
Rage Against the Machine - Serj Tankian - Babyshambles - Blood Red Shoes - Håkan Hellström - The Hives - Danko Jones - Robyn - HIM -The Donnas - Mustasch - Paramore - The Haunted - Linkin Park (cancelled) - Dead by April

2007
Ozzy Osbourne - Korn - 50 Cent - Pet Shop Boys - Velvet Revolver - Black Label Society - Turbonegro - The Ark - Manic Street Preachers - Wolfmother - Evanescence - Amy Winehouse - Sahara Hotnights - Mohair

2006
The Strokes - Kent - Lou Reed - Deftones - Pharrell - The Cardigans - In Flames - Gnarls Barkley - Soundtrack of our Lives - The Sounds - Alice in Chains - Blindside - Backyard Babies - Korn

2005
Marilyn Manson - Snoop Dogg - System of a Down - Nine Inch Nails - Slipknot - Slayer - The Hives - The Mars Volta - Millencolin - Tori Amos - The Hellacopters - Turbonegro

2004
Morrissey - Alicia Keys - Mary J. Blige - Kris Kristofferson - Hatebreed - 3 Doors Down - Pixies - PJ Harvey - Soulfly - The Dillinger Escape Plan - Scissor Sisters - Weeping Willows - Danko Jones - Four Tet

2003
Radiohead - Audioslave - Queens of the Stone Age - Massive Attack - Stereophonics - The Dandy Warhols - The Streets - Ladytron - Counting Crows - Badly Drawn Boy - The Datsuns - Strapping Young Lad - Linkin Park (cancelled In Flames acted instead)

2002
Suede - Rammstein - Caesars Palace - New Order- Chemical Brothers - Slayer - Sonic Youth - Black Rebel Motorcycle Club - Bob Hund - Agnostic Front - Arch Enemy - Starsailor - Lostprophets - Ed Hacourt

2001
Iggy Pop - Manic Street Preachers - Weezer - TOOL - Faithless - Limp Bizkit - Jello Biafra - The Hives - The Nomads (20th anniversary) - Godsmack - Håkan Hellström - Outkast (cancelled) - Queens of the Stone Age - The Shins

2000
Oasis - Rage Against the Machine - Caesars Palace - Primal Scream - Thåström - Mikael Wiehe - Suicidal Tendencies - Kelis - Deftones - Lars Winnerbäck - Asian Dub Foundation - Muse - Travis (cancelled)

1999
Hole - Suede - Marilyn Manson - Joe Strummer - Monster Magnet - Goo Goo Dolls - Fu Manchu - Bloodhound Gang - HammerFall - Manic Street Preachers - Meshuggah - Orgy (cancelled)

1998
Black Sabbath - garbage - Eagle Eye Cherry - Bob Hund - Wilmer X - Rancid - Kent - NOFX - Turbonegro - The Soundtrack of Our Lives

1997
The Prodigy - Suede - Rage Against the Machine - Wu-Tang Clan - Daft Punk - Nick Cave and the Bad Seeds - Stereophonics - The Cardigans - Helmet (band) - Rammstein - Charlatans (British band) - Placebo - The Hellacopters - Millencolin - Marilyn Manson (cancelled) - Supergrass

1996
Blur - Björk - Ministry - The Cure - Iggy Pop - Pulp - Bad Religion - The Prodigy - Bruce Dickinson - Fear Factory - Emmylou Harris - Frank Black - The Bluetones - Skunk Anansie (cancelled)

1995
Pantera - Slayer - Nationalteatern - Chemical Brothers - Supergrass - the Cardigans - Kent - Millencolin - Beastie Boys (cancelled) - Chris Isaak (cancelled)

1994
Motörhead - Oasis - Blur - Midnight Oil - Die Toten Hosen - The Prodigy - Primal Scream - The Verve - Refused - Meshuggah - Bob Hund

1993
The Ramones - Iggy Pop - Rollins Band - Stereo MC's - Manic Street Preachers - Sick of it All - Ulf Lundell - Wilmer X - Bob Hund

1992
Gary Moore - The Pretenders - Primal Scream - Blur - The Creeps - Candlemass - Meshuggah - The Ramones (cancelled)

1991
The Black Crowes - Thåström - Sven Ingvars - Status Quo (cancelled) - PJ Harvey (cancelled) - Stereo MC's (cancelled) - Fisherman

1990
Joan Jett and the Blackhearts - Nick Lowe - Jungle Brothers - Buzzcocks - Wilmer X - Soul Asylum - The Charlatans - Sator - The Sinners

1989
Van Morrison - Motörhead - Disneyland After Dark (Now D-A-D) - Katrina and the Waves - Chris Bailey - Jakob Hellman - Candlemass

1988
Joe Strummer and The Latino Rockabilly War - Eldkvarn - Tone Norum - Stonefunkers - Big Country

1987
Public Image Ltd - Screamin' Jay Hawkins - Dr. Feelgood - Latin Quarter - The Jesus and Mary Chain

1986
Nils Lofgren - New Model Army - Erasure - Reeperbahn - The Triffids
