= Zamárdi =

- Town
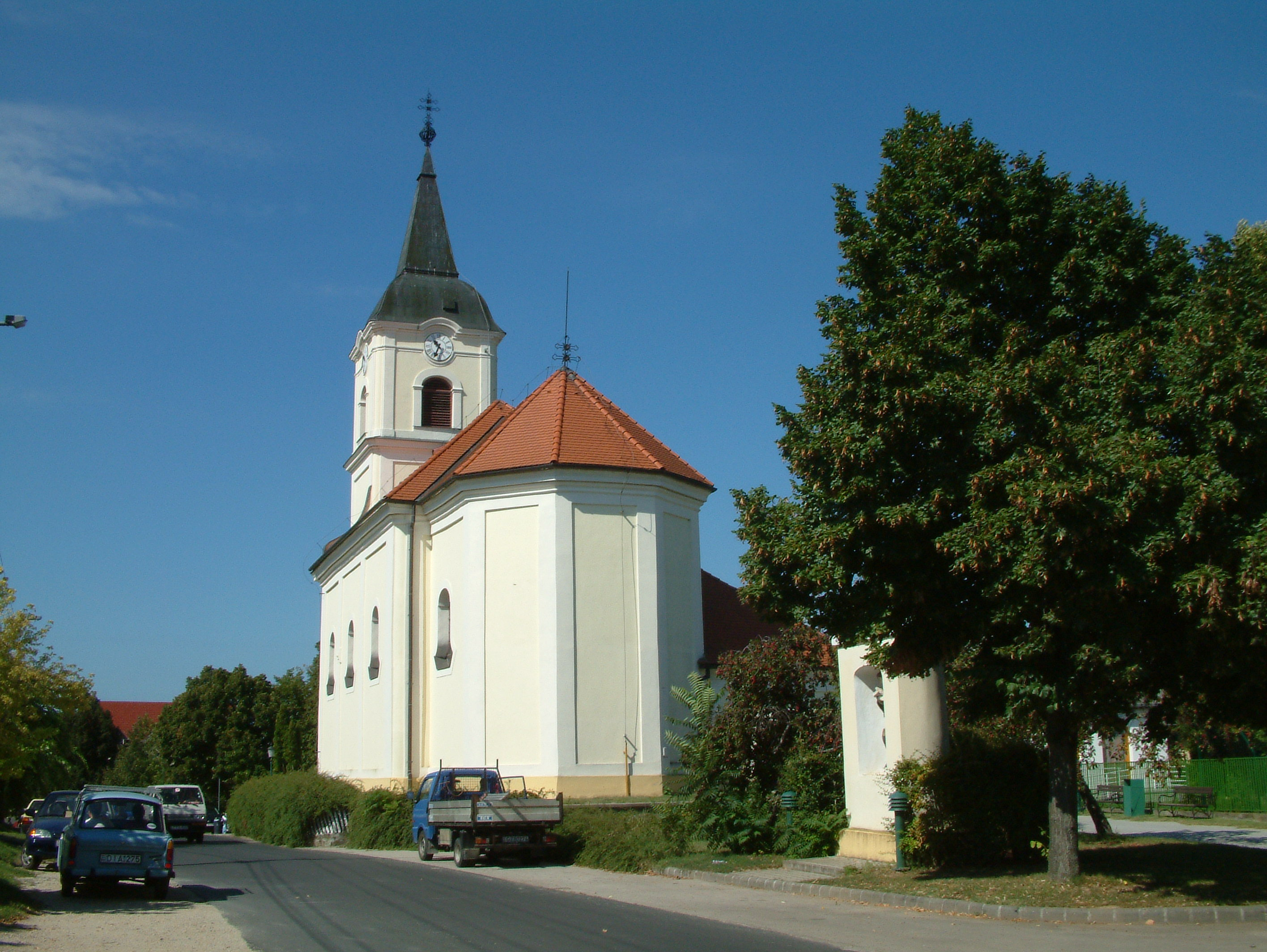
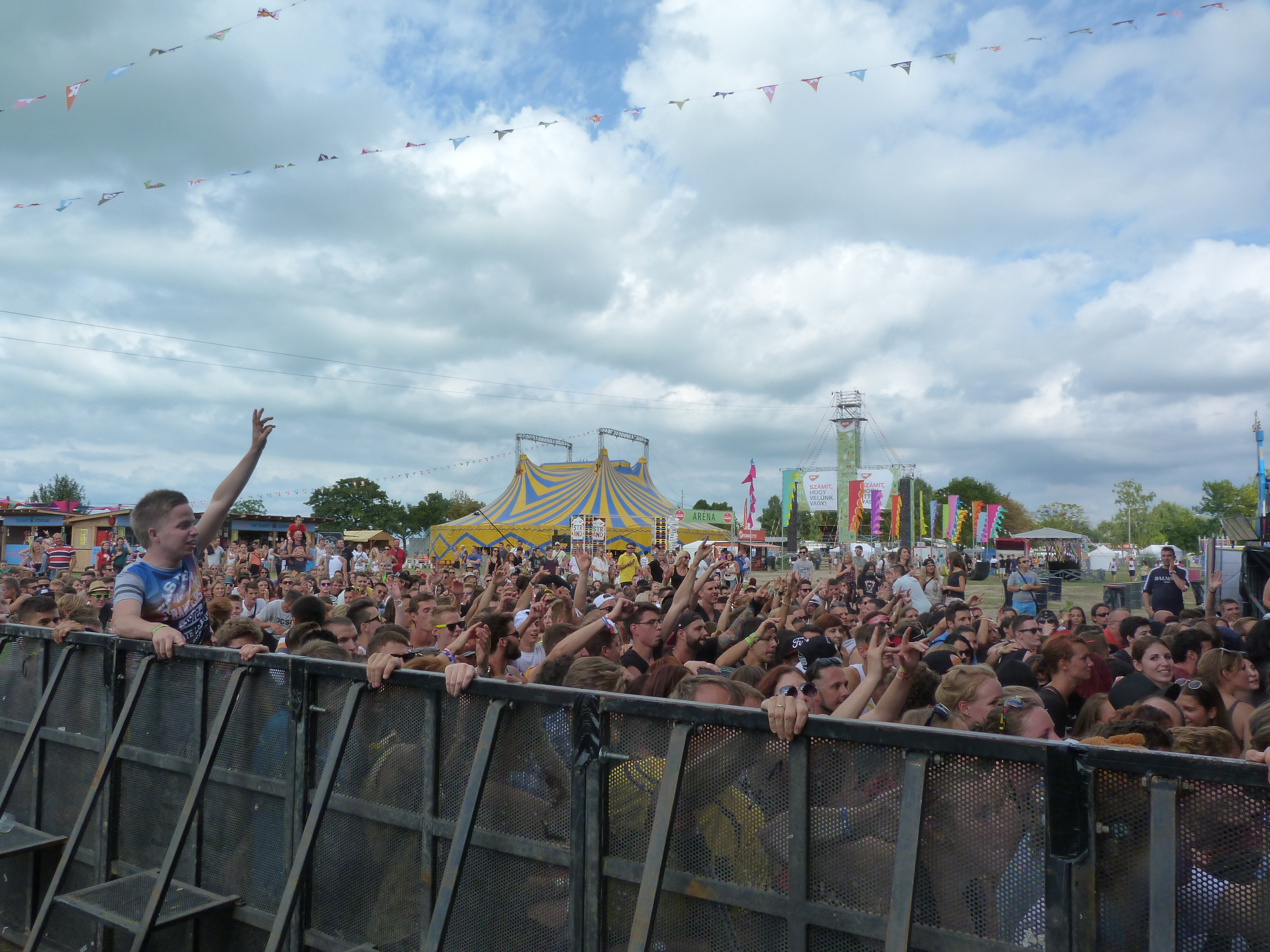
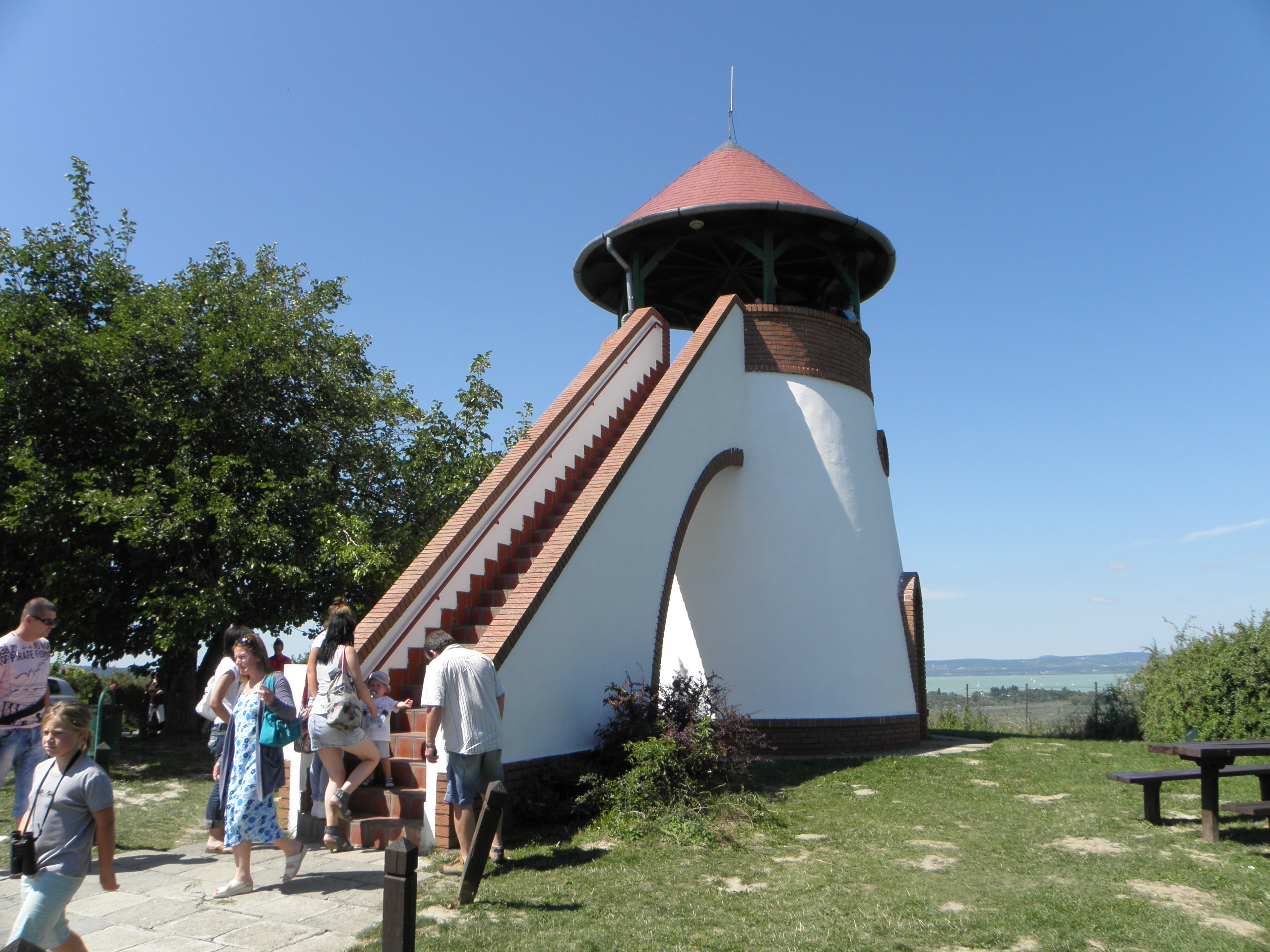
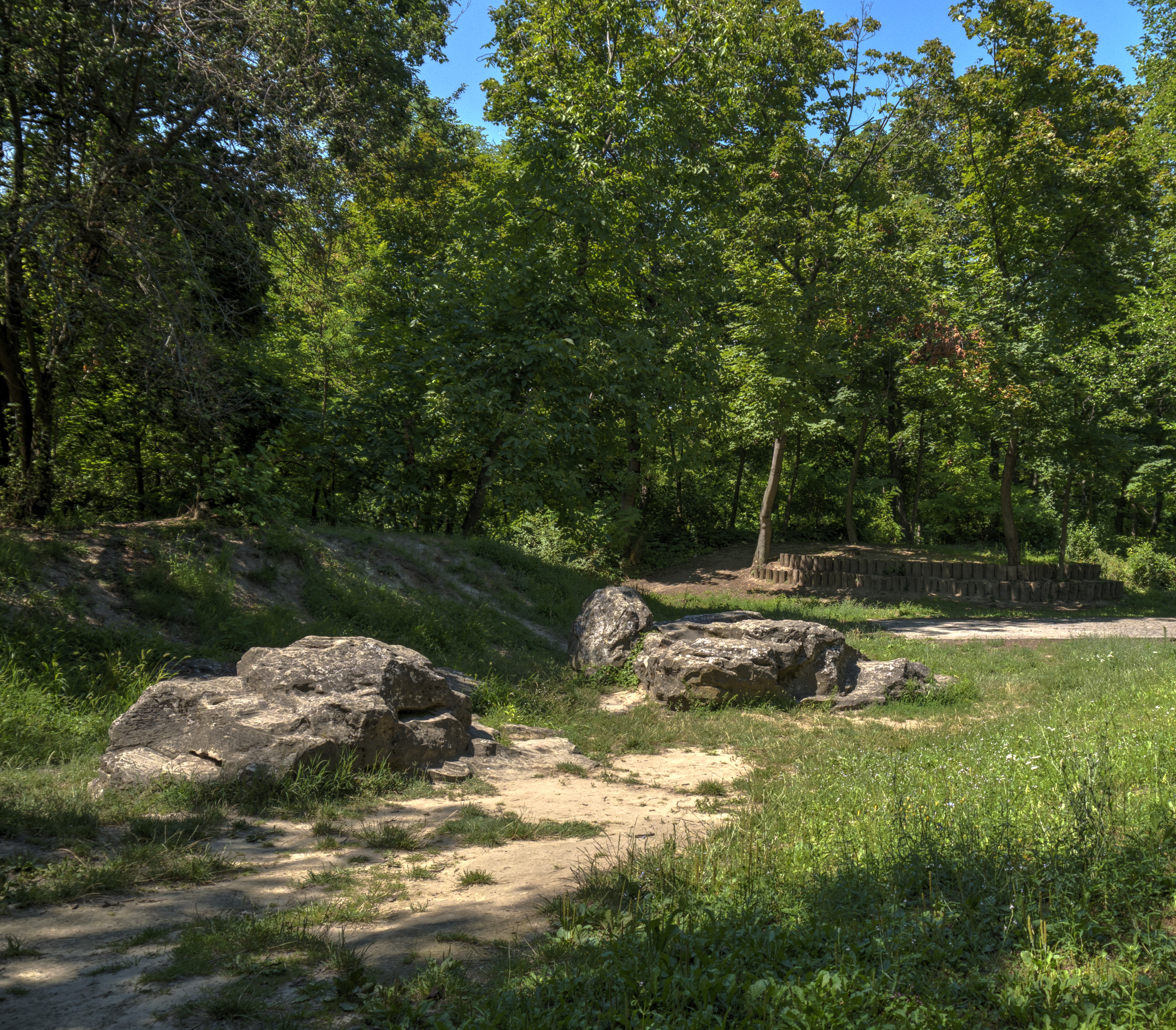
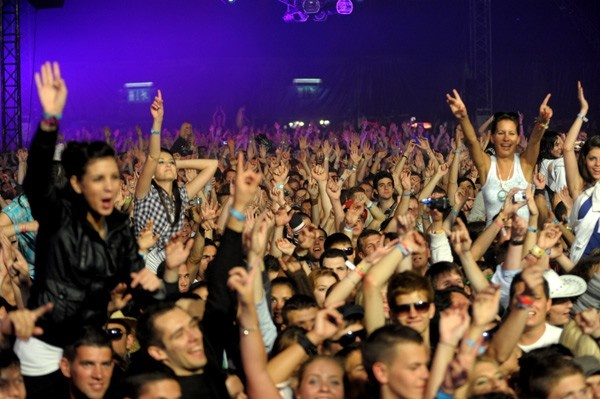
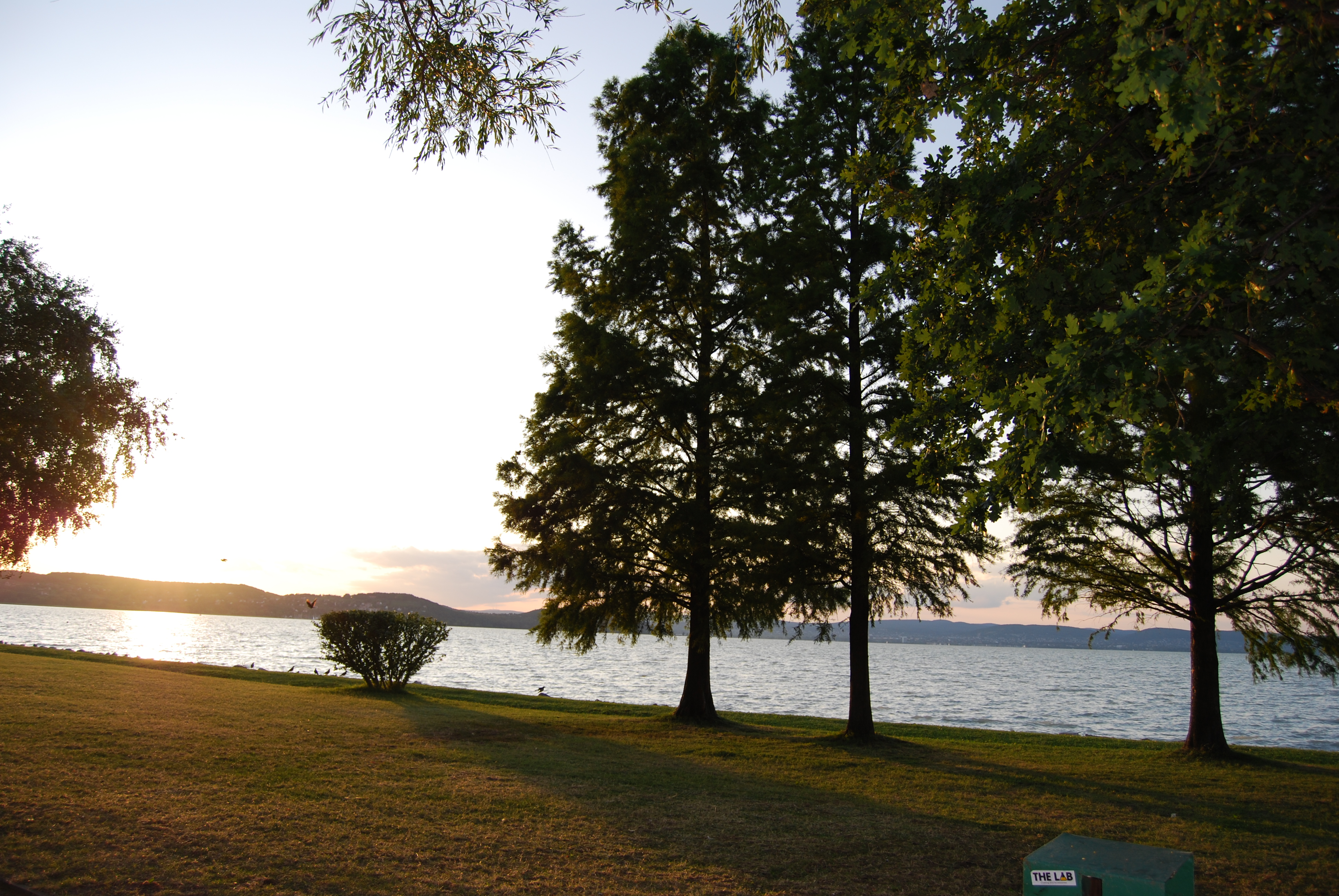
- Descending, from top:Virgin Mary Roman Catholic Church, Strand Festival, Zamárdi Belvedere, Szamárkő (English: Donkey Rock), Balaton Sound, beach at Lake Balaton

- Flag Coat of arms

- Location of Zamárdi
- Coordinates: 46.88434°N 17.95051°E
- Country: Hungary
- County: Somogy
- District: Siófok

Area
  - Total: 45.15 km^{2} (17.43 sq mi)

Population (2017)
  - Total: 2,440
  - Density: 54.0/km^{2} (140/sq mi)
- Demonym: zamárdi
- Time zone: UTC+1 (CET)
  - Summer (DST): UTC+2 (CEST)
- Postal code: 8621
- Area code: (+36) 84
- Patron Saint: Holy Mary
- Motorways: M7
- Distance from Budapest: 113 km (70 mi) Northeast
- NUTS 3 code: HU232
- MP: Mihály Witzmann (Fidesz)
- Website: zamardi.hu

Zamárdi is a town in Somogy County, Hungary. It is known for its beaches at Lake Balaton and for its music festivals during the summer (e.g. Strand Festival, Balaton Sound etc.).

The settlement is part of the Balatonboglár wine region.

== Activities ==
Balaton Sound since 2007, Website: https://balatonsound.com/en/. Location: Lake Balaton.

== Etymology ==
There are several explanations of the origin of the name of Zamárdi.

- According to one theory, the village was called before the Mongol invasion Kis Szent Mártir which later changed to Zamárdi. However, there is no proof for that.
- The older part of the village is on a hill, so the residents brought water on the back of donkeys. Therefore, the village was called Szamárd after szamár (English: donkey) and -d suffix.
- The most accepted theory states that the name derives from a person named Zamar or Somar. He could have been the first owner of the village.

== History ==
Before the arrival of the Hungarians at the turn of the 9th and 10th centuries, the area was populated by Avars. In 1972, a large Avar cemetery was discovered in the village.

== Notable people ==
- Zoltán Kocsis, virtuoso pianist, conductor and composer

== Twin towns – sister cities ==
Zamárdi is twinned with:

- Malsch, Germany
- Mošćenička Draga, Croatia
- Ustrzyki Dolne, Poland
- Vețca, Romania
- Villány, Hungary
