= Down the Rabbit Hole (festival) =

Music festival in the Netherlands

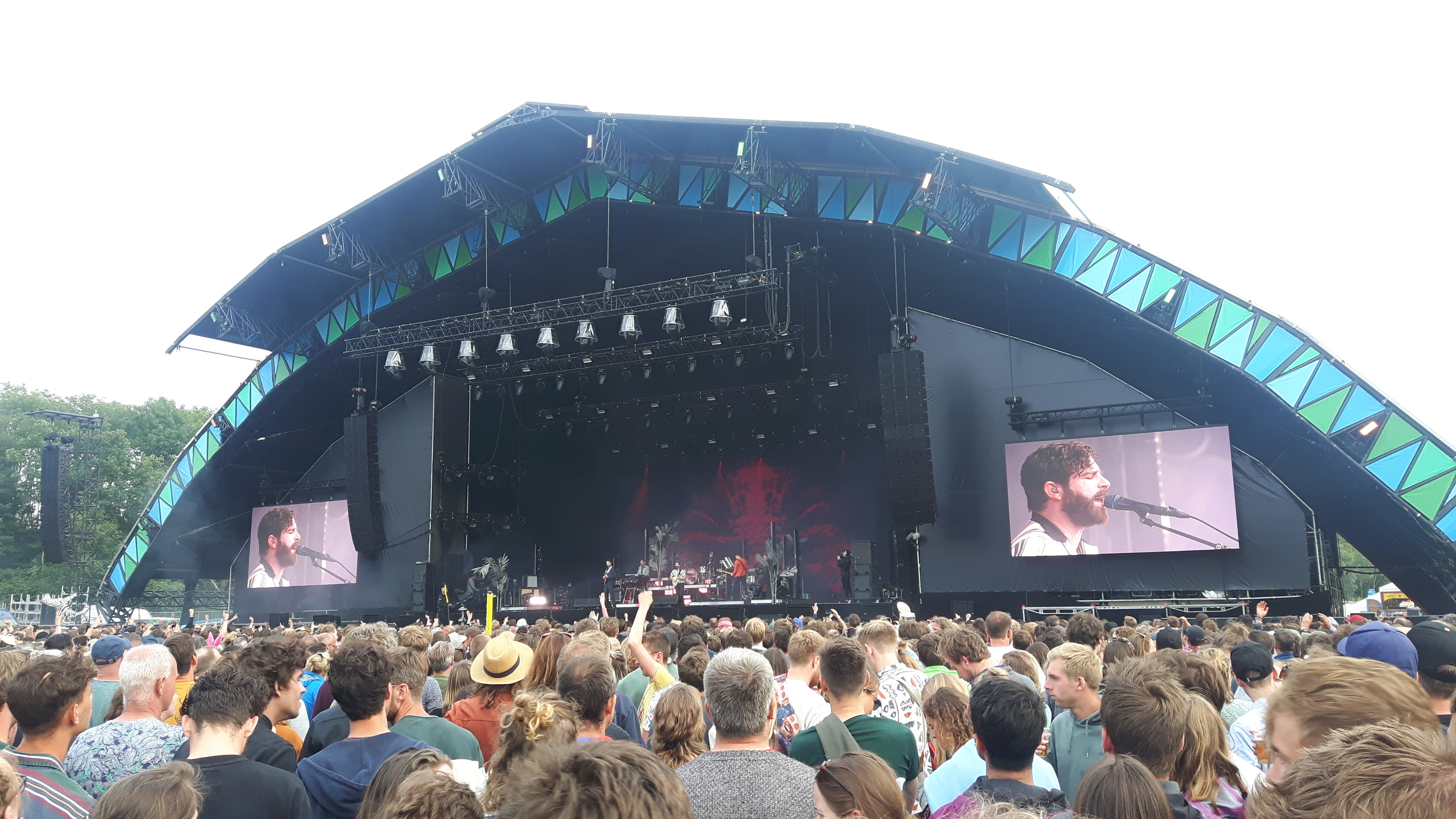
- The main Hotot stage in 2019
- Dates: June or July
- Venue: Recreatiegebied Groene Heuvels
- Locations: Ewijk, Netherlands
- Years active: 2014–present
- Attendance: 47,000 (2024)
- Organizer: Mojo Concerts
- Website: downtherabbithole.nl

Down the Rabbit Hole (DTRH) is a three-day music festival that takes place in the Groene Heuvels leisure area in the village of Ewijk (near Nijmegen) in the Netherlands. It was first organized in 2014 and has since been held annually late June or early July.

Like Lowlands, it is organized by Mojo Concerts and marketed as a competitor to Best Kept Secret. The first edition was attended by around 10,000 people and nominated for two European Festival Awards. The three main stages – "Hotot", "Fuzzy Lop", and "Teddy Widder" – are named after rabbit breeds.

== History ==
The festival's director is Eric van Eerdenburg, who also directs Lowlands. The first edition took place in 2014 from 27 to 29 June. A three-day ticket cost €135, and it was initially marketed as a little brother to Lowlands. De Staat was the first band that opened the festival on the initial Friday. It was headlined by Damon Albarn, The Black Keys and Foals. Down the Rabbit Hole also wanted to book Jack White, but he turned the offer down because he did not want to play the same festival as The Black Keys, who he feuded with. Quickly, the festival drew comparisons to Best Kept Secret, which began a year prior. During his set, Albarn broke the news that Bobby Womack had died. The Netherlands played Mexico in the 2014 FIFA World Cup at the same time that The Naked and Famous were playing, so half of all festival attendees watched a stream of the match on the hill instead of their set. Van Eerdenburg said that his plan was to grow the festival to be attended by 35,000 people soon.

On 17 December 2019, the festival announced its initial 2020 lineup. On 21 April 2020, the edition was cancelled because the Dutch government prohibited large gatherings until 1 September, owing to the COVID-19 pandemic. In April 2021, it was announced that the 2021 edition would be delayed until late August and the location would be moved to the Lowlands site at Biddinghuizen, because the traditional July date was at greater risk of being cancelled and the larger site allowed for better safety. However, on 26 July 2021, the festival was cancelled because multi-day events with camping were prohibited by the government until 1 September, to meet stricter corona measures.

== Festival summary ==
Edition	Year	Dates	Headliners
1st	2014	June 27–29	Damon Albarn · The Black Keys · Foals
2nd	2015	June 26–28	Damien Rice · Iggy Pop · The War on Drugs · Alabama Shakes · Patti Smith
3rd	2016	June 24–26	PJ Harvey · The National · Anohni
4th	2017	June 23–25	Moderat · Fleet Foxes / Nicolas Jaar · Oscar and the Wolf
5th	2018	June 29–July 1	Queens of the Stone Age · Anderson .Paak & The Free Nationals · Nick Cave and the Bad Seeds
6th	2019	July 5–7	Editors · Underworld · Janelle Monáe
Cancelled	2020	July 3–5	Tyler, the Creator · Disclosure
Cancelled	2021	August 27–29	Disclosure · Doe Maar · Gorillaz
7th	2022	July 1–3	Disclosure · Gorillaz · The War on Drugs
8th	2023	June 30–July 2	Fred Again · Burna Boy (replacing Stromae) · Paolo Nutini
9th	2024	July 5–7	LCD Soundsystem · Michael Kiwanuka / Jungle · The National
10th	2025	July 4–6	Massive Attack · Underworld · Sam Fender
11th	2026	July 3–5	Florence and the Machine · Little Simz · The xx
