= Berlin Festival =

Annual music event in Germany

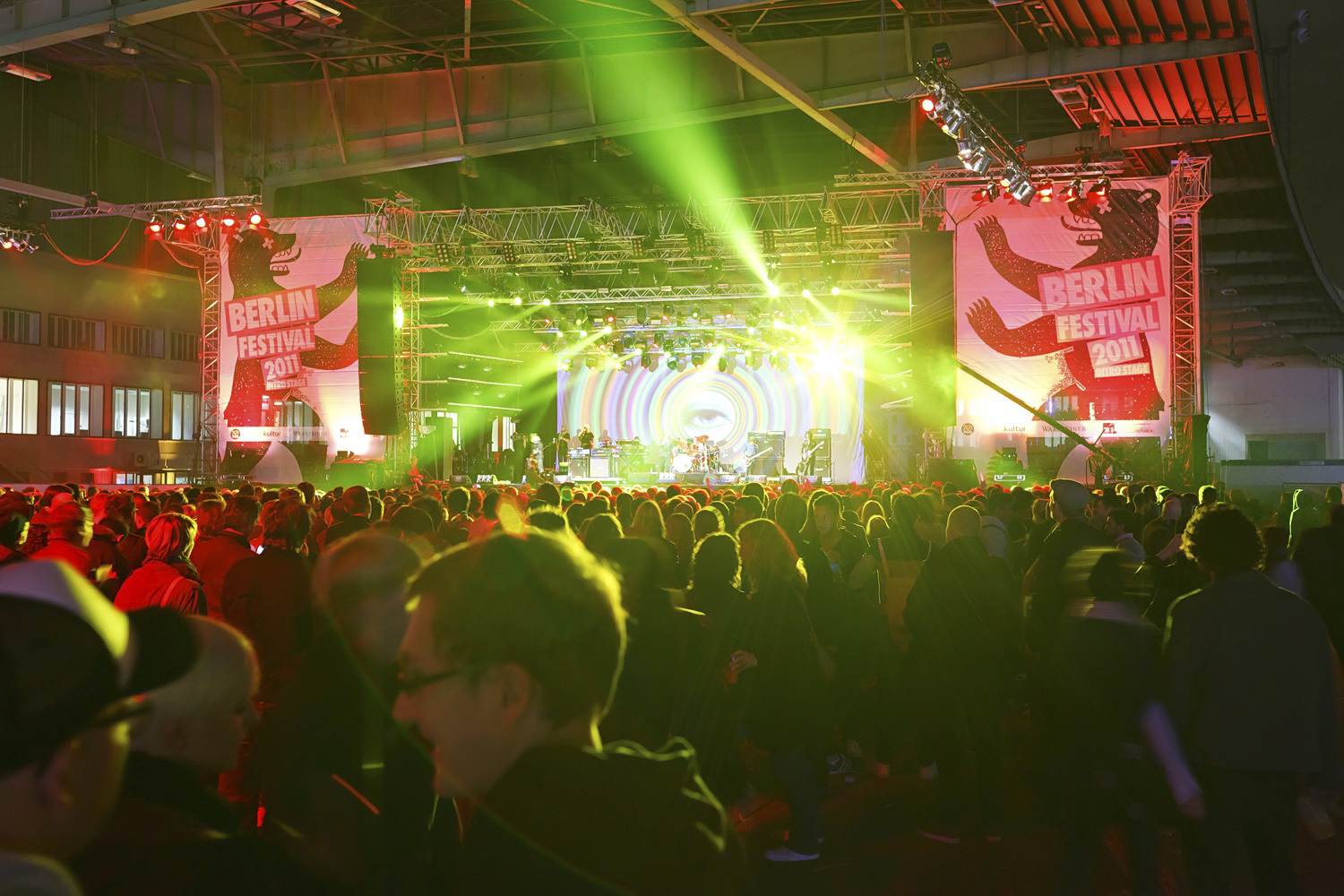
- Genre: Electronic dance music, rock
- Location: Berlin Tempelhof Airport
- Years active: 2005–2015
- Website: Berlin Festival - official site

Berlin Festival was an annual two-day outdoor rock/electronic music event that took place every September in Berlin. It was first organized in 2005, and over time its audience grew to about 20,000 visitors. At the European Festivals Awards 2013, Berlin Festival was awarded the prize for the 'Best European Festival Line-Up'.

After the Berlin Festival 2015, the organizers announced that they would take a "creative break" in 2016. There has not been another Berlin Festival since then, and the official home page has become unreachable.

== See also ==
- List of electronic music festivals
