= Electro Magnetic =

German music festival

Coordinates: 49.2486°N 6.8442°E

Electro Magnetic festival is an outdoor electronic dance music event which is located in the town of Voelklingen near Saarbrücken, south-west Germany. It first took place in 2012 attracting an audience of 8,000 people. The following year (2013), there were about 10,000 visitors. It was awarded 'Best New European Festival' at the European Festivals Awards in 2012. Usually, the festival takes place in July. The 2020 edition was cancelled. Promoters mentioned harder times for festival organizers.

== Headliners (selection) ==
- 2012: Bonaparte, Digitalism, Lexy & K-Paul, Fritz Kalkbrenner, Moonbootica, Tiefschwarz, André Galluzzi, Monika Kruse
- 2013: Booka Shade, Boys Noize, Lexy & K-Paul, M.A.N.D.Y., Monika Kruse, Moonbootica, Pan-Pot, DJ Wankelmut, Onur Özer
- 2014: Ellen Allien, Blomqvist, Felix Da Housecat, Fritz Kalkbrenner, Marek Hemmann, Minoru, Moguai, Oliver Koletzki
- 2015: Chris Liebing, Dixon, Lexy & K-Paul
- 2016: Moguai, Nina Kraviz, Richie Hawtin, Robin Schulz scheduled but set was cancelled, Alle Farben, Andhim, Oliver Koletzki, Meat, Robag Wruhme, Matthias Tanzmann, Gunjah
- 2017: Lexy & K-Paul, Âme, Alle Farben, Chris Liebing, Moonbootica, Matthias Tanzmann, Oliver Huntemann, Joyce Muniz, Rødhåd, DJ Karotte
- 2018: Paul van Dyk, Moonbootica, AKA AKA, Adam Beyer, Felix Kröcher, Neelix, Klaudia Gawlas, Recondite, DJ Tennis, Denis Horvat, Junge Junge
- 2019: Amelie Lens, Carl Cox, FJAAK, Boys Noize, Pan-Pot, Loco Dice, DJ Hooligan, Niels van Gogh, DJ Tomcraft, Kai Tracid, Matthias Tanzmann
