= Open Air St. Gallen =

Annual music festival in Switzerland

Coordinates: 47.4140°N 9.3270°E

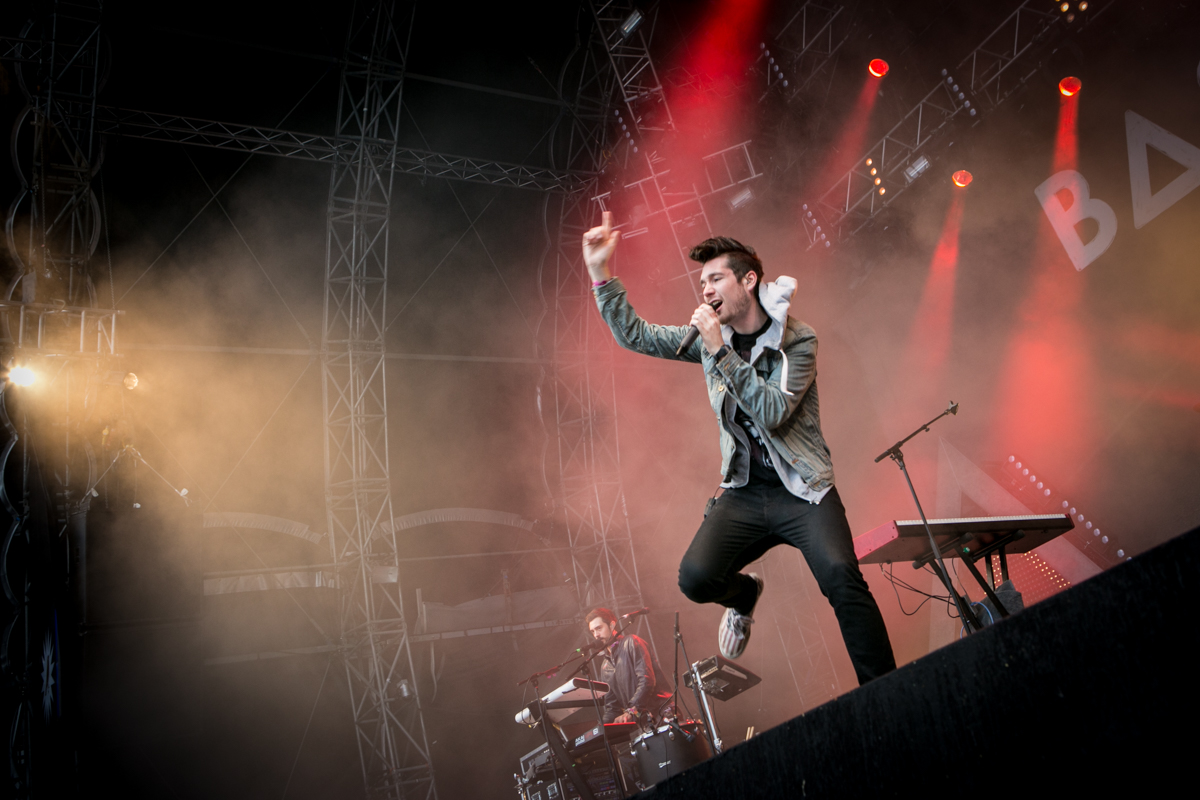
Bastille performing at Open Air St. Gallen in 2014

Open Air St. Gallen is an annual music festival held near the city of St. Gallen, Switzerland. Founded in 1977, it is one of Switzerland's biggest and longest-running open air festivals. It is attended by more than 110,000 people each year.
