= Beatlemania Hamburg =

Museum

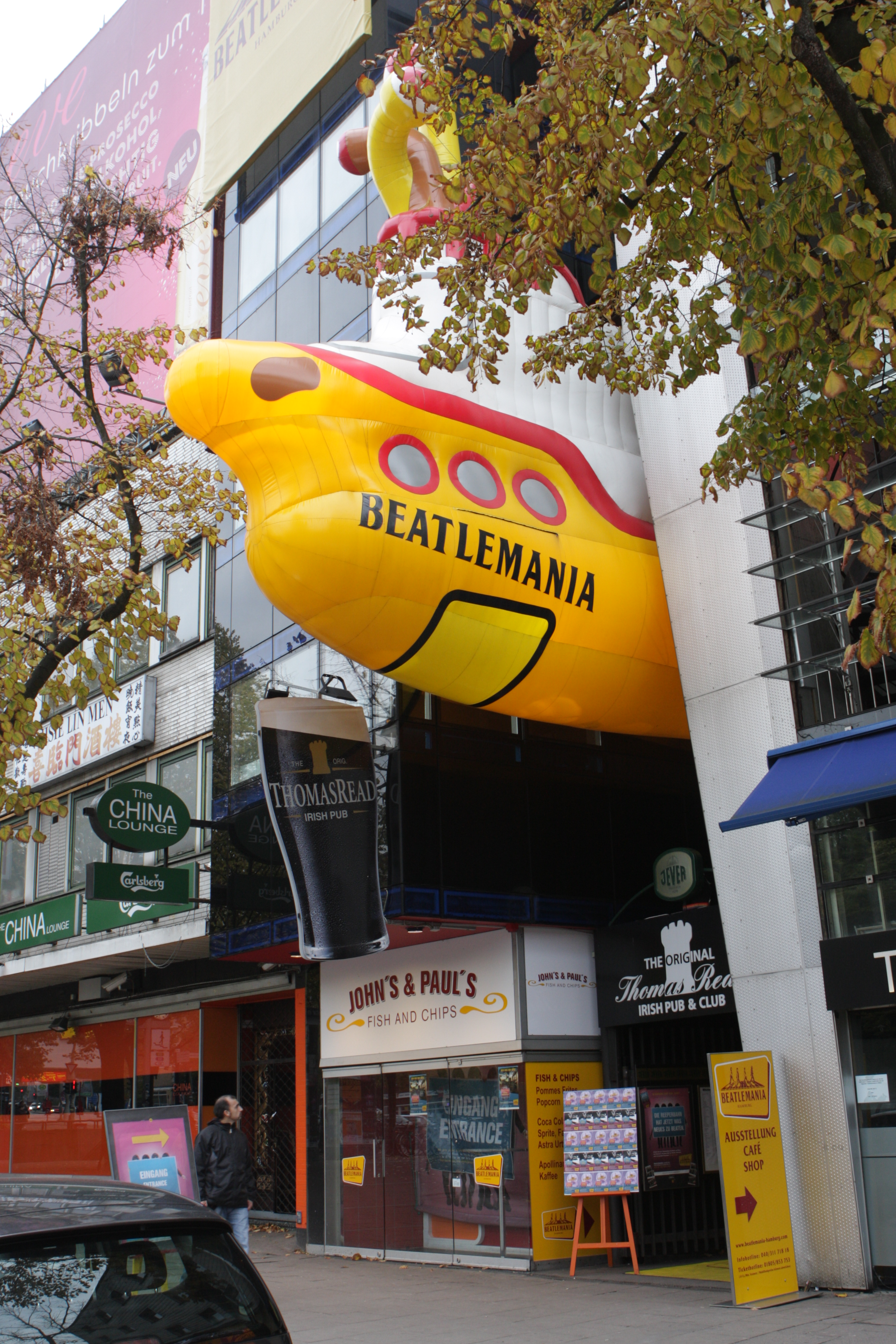
- Exterior of the museum
- Established: 2009
- Dissolved: June 30, 2012
- Location: Hamburg, Germany
- Coordinates: title' 53°33′00″N 09°57′23″E
- Type: Cultural

Beatlemania Hamburg was a museum in Hamburg, Germany, devoted to the Beatles.

The museum opened in May 2009 conceived as a "Beatles experience". It was located in the St. Pauli district, near the Beatles-Platz and the Große Freiheit, where they played in their formative Hamburg period in the early 1960s. It closed for lack of interest on 30 June 2012.

A large model of a yellow submarine hung above the entrance. The museum spanned five floors and eleve themed rooms. The history of the Beatles from their Hamburg period to their break-up was displayed through a mixture of original exhibits, interactive features and fan memorabilia, as well as a reconstruction of the Große Freiheit street in 1960s style.

== See also ==
- List of music museums
