= FKP Scorpio =

Concert promoter based in Hamburg, Germany

FKP Scorpio Concert Productions GmbH
- Native name: FKP Scorpio Konzertproduktionen GmbH
- Type: Private (GmbH)
- Industry: Event promotion
- Founded: 4 October 1990; 35 years ago
- Founder: Folkert Koopmans
- Headquarters: Hamburg, Germany
- Key people: Folkert Koopmans & Stephan Thanscheidt (CEOs); Freddie de Wall (COO); Jörg Jeschke (CFO)
- Owner: CTS Eventim (50.2%)
- Number of employees: ~100
- Subsidiaries: Arcadia Live; FKP Area One; FKP Scorpio Belgium; FKP Scorpio Norway; FKP Scorpio Poland; FKP Scorpio Sweden; Communion ONE; Friendly Fire; Fullsteam; Smash!Bang!Pow! FKP Scorpio Entertainment; FKP Scorpio Entertainment Nordic; FKP Eventservice; PALAZZO Produktionen
- Website: Official website

FKP Scorpio is an international concert promoter, based in Hamburg, Germany. Founded by Folkert Koopmans in 1990, the group is widely recognised as one of Europe's largest festival and concert promoters.

== History ==
=== Early years ===
In January 1981, aged 17, Folkert Koopmans promoted his first concert for a local band named Amuthon in Marienhafe, where he grew up. After dropping out of Hochschule Emden/Leer, Koopmans moved to Hamburg, where he worked as a booking agent for Große Freiheit 36 and Docks. He founded "SCORPIO" Konzertproduktionen GmbH in October 1990, named after the Scorpio zodiac sign.

=== Name change ===
In 2000, a band named SCORPIONS sued Scorpio, claiming that the similarity of the name could cause confusion. Folkert and the band eventually settled, renaming his company FKP SCORPIO Konzertproduktionen GmbH (FKP standing for Folkert Koopmans Presents).

=== 2013-present ===
In 2013, Koopmans promoted Stephan Thanscheidt to co-CEO and partner of the business.

In 2014, FKP acquired Finnish booking agency Fullsteam.

In 2017, CTS Eventim bought a 50.2% stake in FKP Scorpio, effectively acquiring the business.

In November 2017, FKP's Hamburg offices were raided by the Hamburg Dienststelle Interne Ermittlungen (internal investigations department) after an anonymous tip-off that the company offered 100 free tickets for a Rolling Stones concert to the Hamburg-Nord district office that approved said concert. The so-called "Freikarten-Affäre" (Free Ticket Affair) ended in the district chief being fined and no bribery charges being found on FKP's behalf.

In 2020 and 2021, FKP expanded its operations in the booking agency space. FKP Scorpio acquired Nordic Live in January 2020. At the time they represented over 60 artists including Alan Walker, Ina Wroldsen and Kurt Nilsen. In the same month, Koopmans launched the All Artists Agency "full-service agency", after CTS were blocked from acquiring the Four Artists Agency. It also formed a partnership with Berlin-based agency Area One in April 2021, named FKP Area One, which specialises in rock/metal acts.

In 2024, FKP's UK subsidiary merged with indie promoter Communion Presents, forming "Communion ONE".

== Festivals ==
FKP operates a number of festivals, namely:

- Since 1997: Hurricane Festival
- Since 1998: Highfield Festival
- Since 1999: Southside Festival
- Since 2000: Chiemsee Summer, M'era Luna Festival
- Since 2001: Indian Summer Festival (Netherlands)
- Since 2003: Malakoff
- Since 2005: Greenfield Festival
- Since 2009: Plage Noire, Rolling Stone Beach
- Since 2010: Elbjazz
- Since 2012: Deichbrand
- Since 2013: Metal Hammer Paradise, Best Kept Secret
- Since 2014: Tuckerville, Provinssirock
- Since 2015: Where's The Music?, A Summer's Tale, Sideways Festival
- Since 2019: METAStadt Open Airs
- Since 2022: Tempelhof Sounds, Meadowlands, Rosendal Garden Party, Syd For Solen, Aairport, Loaded, Live Is Live
- Since 2023: Lido Sounds Festival
- Since 2025: Broken Summer

FKP Scorpio also formerly operated Danish festivals Tinderbox and Northside with Down The Drain Holdings, from 2015 up until it sold its stake to DTD in 2018.

== Notable artists ==
FKP Scorpio have promoted concerts for a number of notable artists, including The Rolling Stones, Roger Waters, and the Foo Fighters.

FKP has a close relationship in particular with Ed Sheeran, having promoted him in Germany since 2011, early on in his career.

== Other ventures ==
FKP have previously organised musicals like "Mein Freund Wickie" and wrestling shows. Since 2008, it has also run the "Palazzo" Dinner theaters across Germany.

In 2008, FKP created the subsidiary FKP Ausstellungs und Betriebs ("Exhibitions and Operations", now FKP Eventservice), primarily to operate the Beatlemania Hamburg museum, which operated 2009-2012.

In 2013, FKP Scorpio launched its "Grün Rockt" (English: Green Rocks) suistainability initiative with the aim of reducing waste and emissions at its festivals. Since 2013, it has published a report for each festival detailing how much waste was produced and an evaluation of its sustainability measures. One of these measures, Trasholution, aims to gamifies recycling. FKP donate 1€ for each bag of waste collected by festivalgoers to local social projects; the live results are displayed on site.

In 2022, FKP launched a new subsidiary named FKP Show Creations, a production business focused on "musicals, shows, family entertainment and opera." Since renamed FKP Scorpio Entertainment, the division has produced licensed shows that have toured worldwide, for brands like Formula 1, Disney, Jurassic World and Minecraft.
