= I Love Techno =

Music event in Montpellier, France

Coordinates: 51°1′37.48″N 3°41′30.45″E

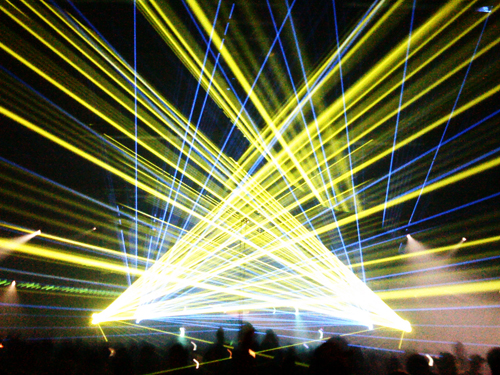
- I Love Techno 2009 lasershow
- Genre: Electronic dance music
- Locations: Montpellier, France
- Years active: 1995-present
- Attendance: 40,000+
- Website: Official site

I Love Techno is an international techno music event that takes place in Montpellier, France. National and international DJs perform every year at this event. Associated with the event is a set of music prizes known as the Elektropedia Awards, which are given for excellence in various categories related to techno and the broader electronic dance music genre.

== History ==
From 1995-2014 the festival was based in Ghent, Belgium. The first edition of this event took place in 1995 at Vooruit and attracted 700 people. The line-up included Richie Hawtin, Jeff Mills and Daft Punk. Because of the sudden growth of the party, the event moved to Flanders Expo. At this venue there was one central room connected to five others named after colours: Red, Yellow, Blue, Orange and Green. The 2003 edition featured an Outdoor area.

At its peak, the festival in Ghent attracted about 40,000 visitors from Belgium, the United Kingdom, the Netherlands, France, Ireland, Spain and Germany as well other parts of Europe and the rest of the world. Many spin-off versions of the festival have been held over the years across Europe.

In 2015, it was announced that the main festival would relocate to Montpellier, France as crowds had shrunk to between 20,000-24,000. Former I Love Techno organiser Peter Decuypere partly blamed the shrinking crowds on the festival embracing genres like dubstep and electro house. "The map was redrawn by dubstep and electro," he said. "I think that caused a lot of damage to the I Love Techno brand.".

Associated with the event is a set of music prizes known as the Elektropedia Awards, which are given for excellence in various categories related to techno and the broader electronic dance music genre.

== See also ==
- List of electronic music festivals
