= Lowlands (festival) =

Dutch music festival

Coordinates: 52°25′58″N 5°45′55″E

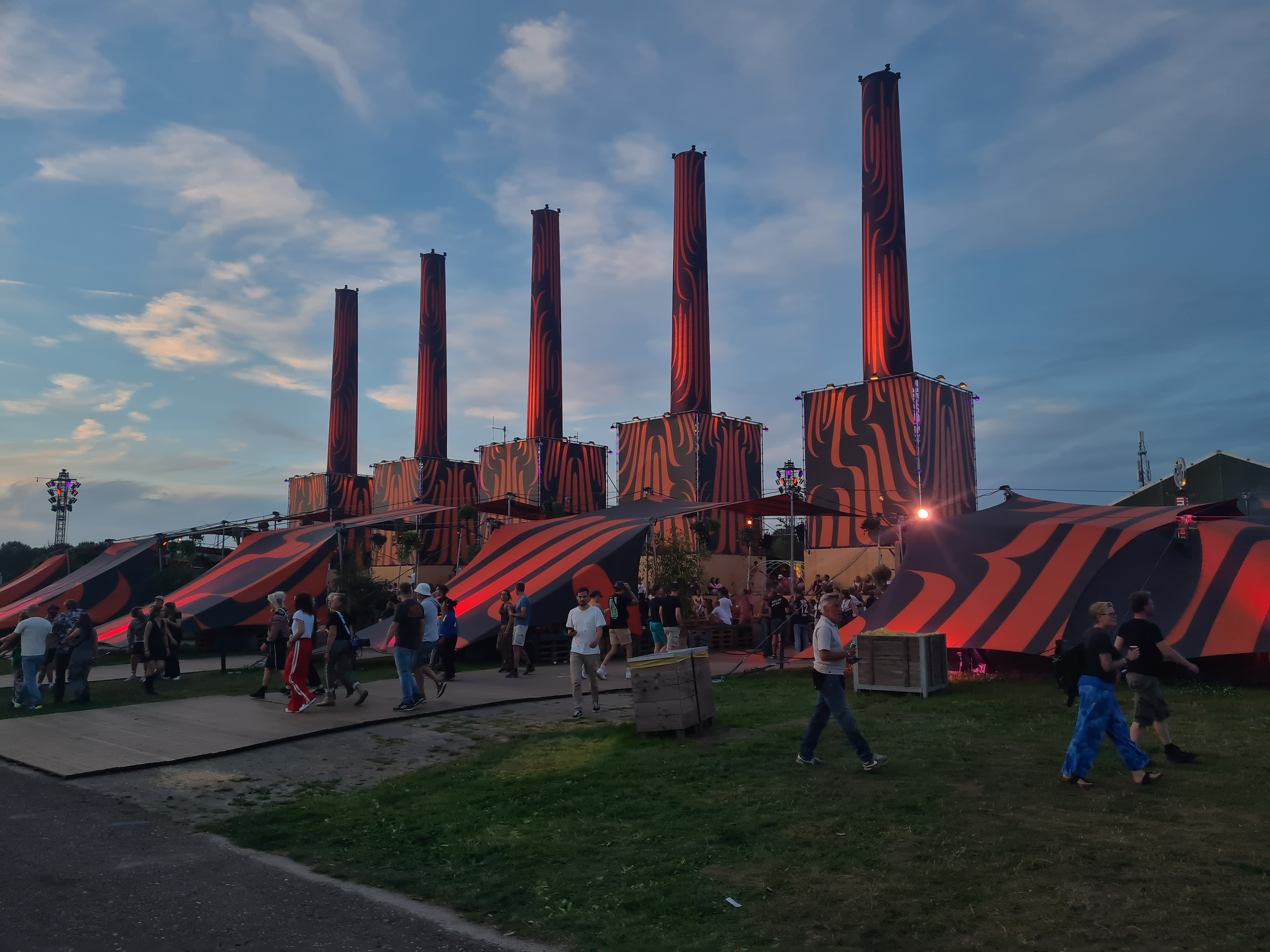
- The characteristic chimneys of Lowlands 2024 in the ArmadiLLow area, accessible 24 hours a day during the festival weekend.
- Dates: Third weekend of August
- Locations: Spijk en Bremerberg, Biddinghuizen, Netherlands
- Years active: 1993–present
- Founders: Mojo Concerts, Loc7000
- Attendance: ~55,000
- Website: Official website

A Campingflight to Lowlands Paradise (commonly called Lowlands or Lowlands Festival) is an annual three-day music and performing arts festival held in the Netherlands. The festival takes place in Biddinghuizen, in the province of Flevoland.

Although the main focus is on music – rock, pop, dance, hip hop and alternative – Lowlands also offers indoor and outdoor cinema, street theatre, cabaret, stand-up comedy, ballet, literature and comic strips.

In recent years, the festival has attracted around 55,000 visitors and features over 200 acts on more than ten stages, which are named according to the NATO phonetic alphabet apart from the Heineken stage (named after the festival’s main sponsor since 2015). Most stages are housed in large tents to protect spectators from bad weather, with the largest being approximately the size of a regulation football pitch.

== History ==
=== 1967–1968: Origin and debacle ===
The festival is a successor to one of the first Dutch pop festivals: A Flight to Lowlands Paradise, organised in November 1967 by the Utrecht-based artist and painter Bunk Bessels. This festival took place in the Margriethal of the Jaarbeurs in Utrecht. The entry fee was 10 Dutch guilders (approximately €4.50), including breakfast. This 18-hour-long event had no major acts but featured experimental theatre, dancing, poetry, films, body painting and massage.

On 28 December 1968, the festival was held for the second time, postponed from the original date of 23 November in an attempt to book Jimi Hendrix. This failed, and other major acts such as Jeff Beck and Jethro Tull also cancelled. Pink Floyd remained on the bill. The event sold out its 18,000 capacity, but many people were unable to enter, resulting in unrest and police intervention.

=== 1993–1997: Revival and growth ===
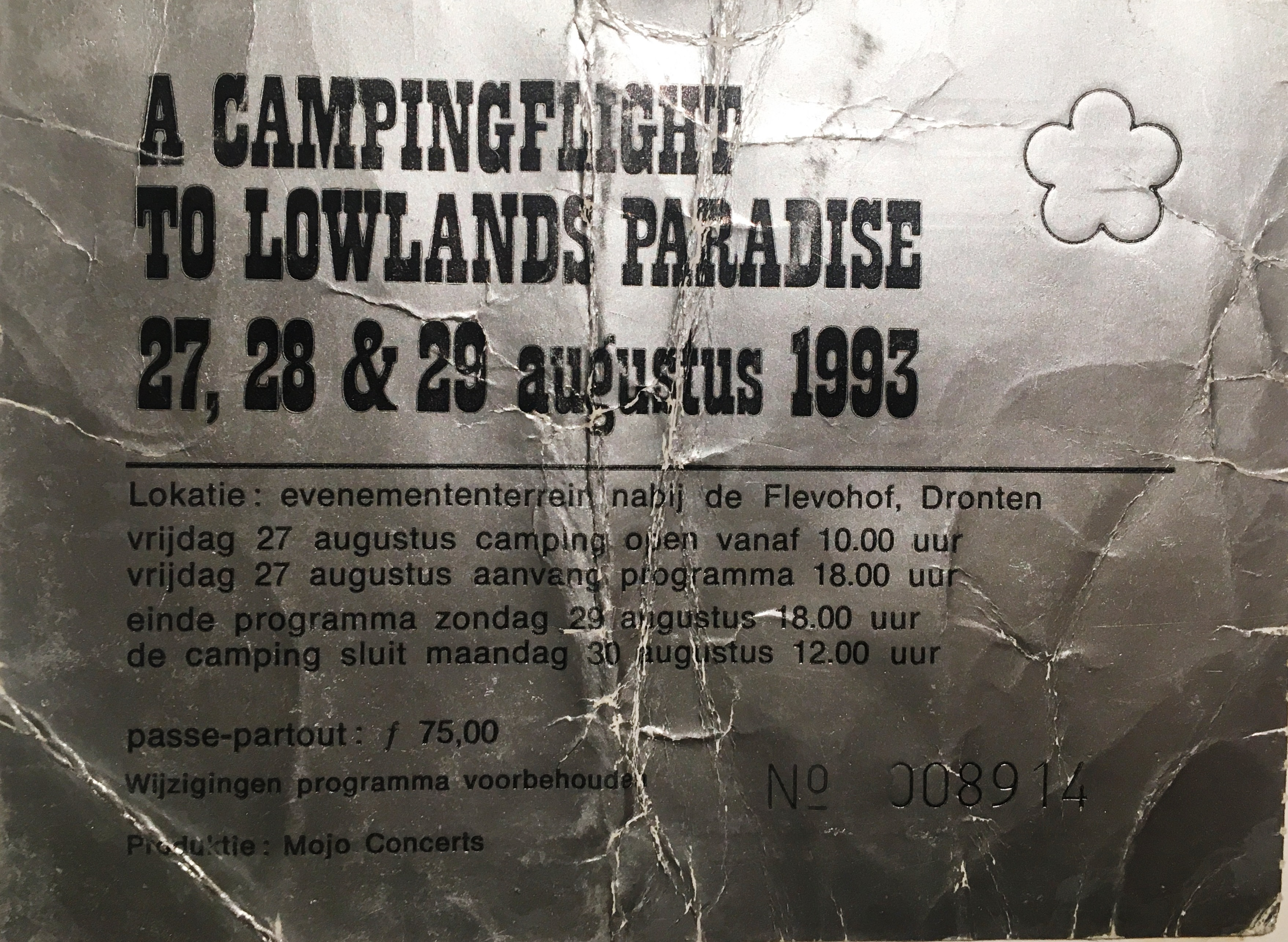
A Lowlands ticket in 1993 with a price of 75 guilders, about 34 euros.

In August 1993, the first edition of "A Campingflight To Lowlands Paradise" took place after Willem Venema revived the concept. Weather conditions were poor: only 15°C with rain on Friday, and Sunday being the best day at 18°C. Tickets were sold at the entrance for 75 guilders, and visitors received a hand-drawn floor plan. Attendees could pitch their tents immediately to the left after entering, behind which a camping shop was located. The festival site consisted of only a small stage tent and a larger one. Many visitors came specifically to see Rage Against the Machine, and on Saturday the Urban Dance Squad. Organiser Mojo Concerts aimed for 10,000 visitors, but only 7,000 attended. A month earlier, the festival had nearly been cancelled due to organisational problems and slow ticket sales. Mojo continued regardless and secured several major acts, partly because Lowlands takes place the same weekend as Pukkelpop (Belgium) and Reading (United Kingdom), meaning American rock bands could perform multiple shows during the same trip.

In 1994, several features became characteristic for the decades to come. Tents were named using the NATO phonetic alphabet: Alpha, Bravo and Charlie. Graphic designer and Claw Boys Claw singer Peter te Bos created the festival’s visual style and mascot "Rapid Razor Bob", which remained central to Lowlands’ identity for over twenty years until the collaboration ended in 2016. With the addition of another tent, attendance rose to 12,500 – 5,000 more than the previous year.

External videos
- The 1995 Osdorp Posse performance
- The orange war

Growth continued in 1995: 20,000 people visited the festival. The event broadened culturally, adding a theatre tent (Delta) and a comedy tent (Echo), alongside the three existing music tents. For the first time, the festival sold out. Due to electrical issues, The Prodigy’s performance was delayed. Amsterdam hip hop group Osdorp Posse performed early on Saturday evening in the Charlie tent. During the show, frontman Def P shouted: "They should have fucking put us in the big tent, pull a fucking tent peg out of the ground and let the cancer ceiling collapse." Security rushed to the tent to maintain order; according to Def P, it was a miracle no one was killed.

In 1996, Lowlands became a major ‘crossover’ festival, showcasing many genres including pop, rock, grunge, dance, house and hip hop. Side programming in film and cabaret also grew. Attendance increased to 31,000, and ticket prices doubled compared to 1993. More diverse food options were added, distinguishing Lowlands from other festivals. On Sunday evening, visitors overturned containers filled with squeezed oranges, sparking an iconic orange-peel fight.

In 1997, gabber was extremely popular, so Lowlands booked Dj Dano, who was showered with beer and ended his show early. This indicated that even for a diverse festival, visitors had limits regarding genre variety. Punk band Pennywise stopped its performance after a female crowdsurfer fell and injured her arm. When security walked off after being insulted by the singer, fans stormed the stage. Attendance reached 40,000, but many complained that the site had become overcrowded. Nevertheless, both visitors and newspapers praised the festival. Life of Agony later released Unplugged at the Lowlands Festival '97.

=== 1998–2002: The "bridge of death" and end to rapid growth ===
To expand the site, Lowlands crossed the trunk road in 1998 by building an improvised bridge and placing the campsite on the other side. The bridge later gained the nickname “the bridge of death” because it is difficult to cross with festival gear, becoming an iconic part of Lowlands. For the first time, tents were renamed for commercial sponsors: the Delta tent became the Dommelsch tent. The 1998 edition welcomed 45,000 visitors. The Beastie Boys’ performance in the Alpha tent had to be paused because the crowd became dangerously packed.

In 1999, Lowlands reached a point where the site had been fully utilised. A new medium-sized tent, India, was introduced. The Dommelsch tent became an outdoor cinema after 23:00, and nighttime programming grew significantly. Cultural programming such as theatre, stand-up comedy and literature also expanded. About 58,000 people visited the festival. At the campsite, a visitor climbed a light pole, fell and did not survive.

The 2000 edition opened with a minute of silence and a strict crowdsurfing ban following the Roskilde tragedy earlier that summer.

In 2001, 57,000 people attended. It was the warmest edition ever at the time, reaching 30°C on Sunday.

External videos
- Lowlands. Within Temptation — Deceiver of Fools (Live)

With the introduction of the euro in 2002, ticket prices rose from 195 guilders (€88.50) to €97.50, though increases had already been planned. Attendance hit 60,000, but the festival was considered too crowded and the weather was poor. Newly appointed festival director Eric van Eerdenburg realised changes were needed to restore the ideal festival experience.

=== 2003–2012: Need for innovation and a golden era ===
In 2003, van Eerdenburg implemented reforms in response to the overcrowded and poorly received 2002 edition. For the first time since 1999, Lowlands did not sell out, dropping from 60,000 visitors to 48,000. Pricetags rose to €107.50, which may have passed a psychological threshold. Biodegradable plastic was used for the first time. The Charlie tent disappeared, and the large Dommelsch stage was replaced by a covered tent with the same name (later renamed Grolsch in 2004 and Heineken in 2015). Silent disco headphones were also introduced.

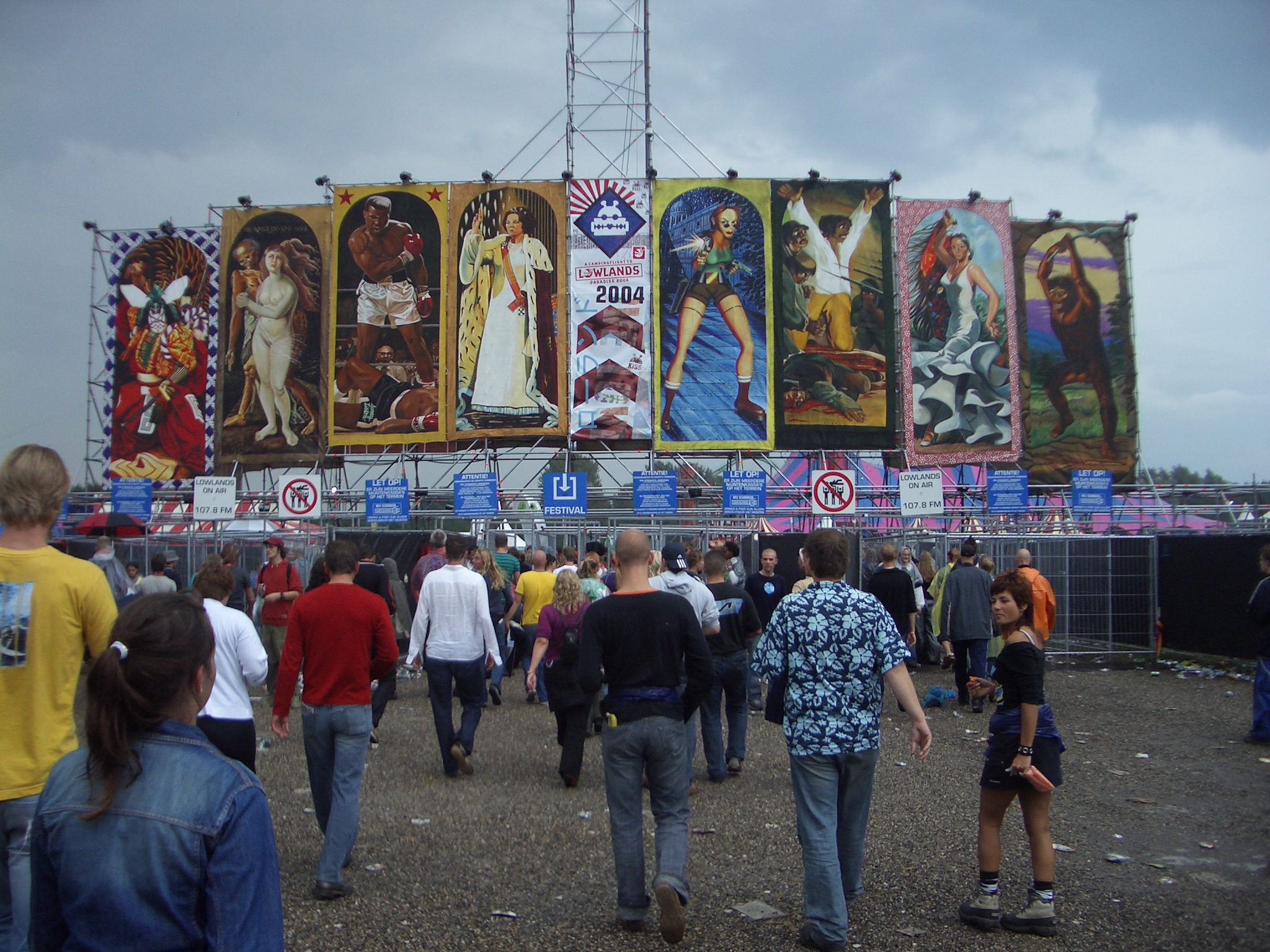
The entrance to Lowlands in 2004.

A running gag spread across Lowlands in 2004: a year earlier, a boy named Theo Vlaar left the entrance queue to urinate and could no longer find his friends on return. They kept calling out for him; others joined in, and shouting random names quickly became a Lowlands tradition. Attendance increased to 52,000. For the first time, a deposit was introduced on plastic cups, which earned visitors a token worth about €2 when returned.

In 2005, Lowlands gained momentum again, partly because it was moved from the final to the third weekend of August, when more major international acts tour Europe. Tickets sold out at the door.

The 2006 edition sold out a month in advance. The X-ray, a corrugated-steel dome hosting experimental acts, was introduced, as was the “Magneetbar”, where visitors could perform themselves.

In 2007 and 2008, the festival sold out again, with 2008 being the fastest sell-out ever as of that time.

In 2010, ticket sales launched with a special kickoff event, selling out within a week—too quickly, according to organisers, as loyal visitors struggled to buy tickets.

In 2011, the Dutch government announced cultural budget cuts and a VAT increase on concert tickets. Lowlands pre-emptively started ticket sales in November 2010, which proved successful: all tickets sold out within two hours. After the VAT increase was later postponed and reversed, the festival still benefited from early sales. The terrain changed for the first time in a decade, with the Bravo tent moving to make room for the Titty Twïster, a venue featuring literature by day and striptease performances at night.

With 27°C on Friday and even higher temperatures over the weekend, 2012 became the warmest Lowlands ever. Foo Fighters were scheduled for a 2.5-hour show but stopped after two hours due to the heat.

=== 2013–present: Reinvention and new audiences ===
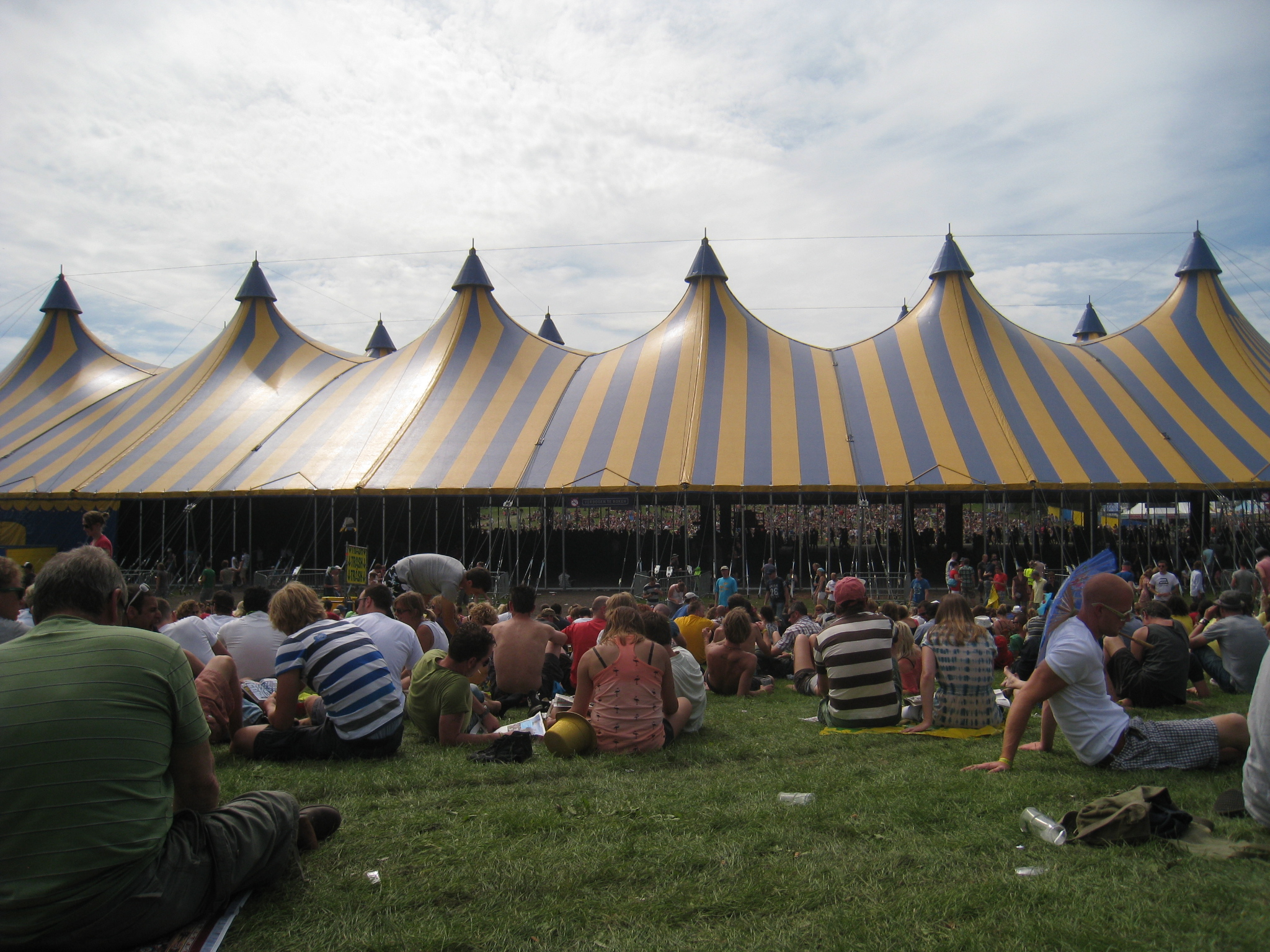
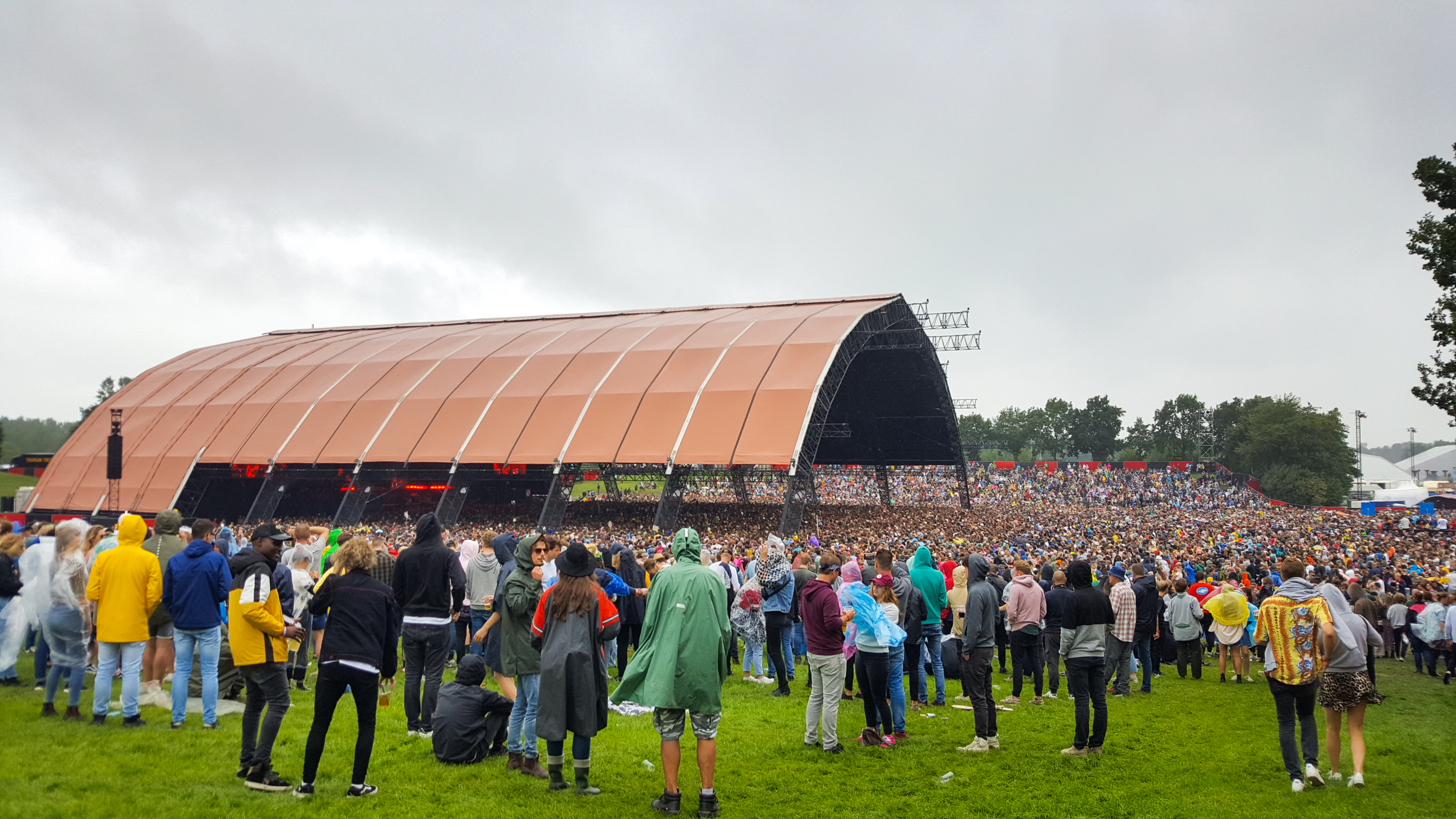
The Alpha is the largest stage at Lowlands festival, with a capacity of 15,000 attendees. It succeeded the "Hoofdpodium" (main stage) in 1993. The blue and yellow striped circus tent (on the left) was replaced in 2017 by a higher, more open tent with an arched roof (on the right).

In January 2013, booking office Friendly Fire, a competitor of Mojo, announced a new three-day festival called Best Kept Secret. The first artist announcements — Arctic Monkeys, Portishead, Alt-J and Sigur Rós — suggested that Lowlands was no longer the only major destination for indie music. Nevertheless, Lowlands 2013 (€175) sold out within two hours. After the festival, it was reported that an Amsterdam visitor found unconscious on a remote part of the grounds during the first night had died in hospital. He had used ecstasy, though it was unclear whether it caused his death.

In 2014, Lowlands took much longer to sell out. According to festival director van Eerdenburg, “part of the older generation seems to be dropping out”. Major dance acts such as Skrillex, Major Lazer and Disclosure attracted a younger audience, while alienating long-time rock-oriented visitors. Another factor may have been Mojo’s own new festival, Down the Rabbit Hole, a more intimate event with a focus on alternative music. Lowlands scrapped the deposit-return system for plastic cups after years of complaints about people who collected mugs in bulk—sometimes making up to €1,000 a day—and were allegedly involved in pickpocketing.

Ahead of the 2015 edition, many observers considered the year crucial for Lowlands’ future. Loyal visitors were drifting away, competition at home and abroad was increasing, and major acts demanded ever-higher fees. Lowlands did not sell out, for the first time since 2004: just over 48,000 visitors attended (capacity 55,000). Several small site adjustments were made: tents Charlie and Lima swapped locations, and the Titty Twïster closed after four years. The Alpha and Bravo tents were slightly reduced in size to create a more intimate atmosphere. A new beer supplier, Heineken, replaced Dommelsch and Grolsch.

In 2017, designer Hansje van Halem became head of festival identity after two decades of visual design by Peter te Bos.

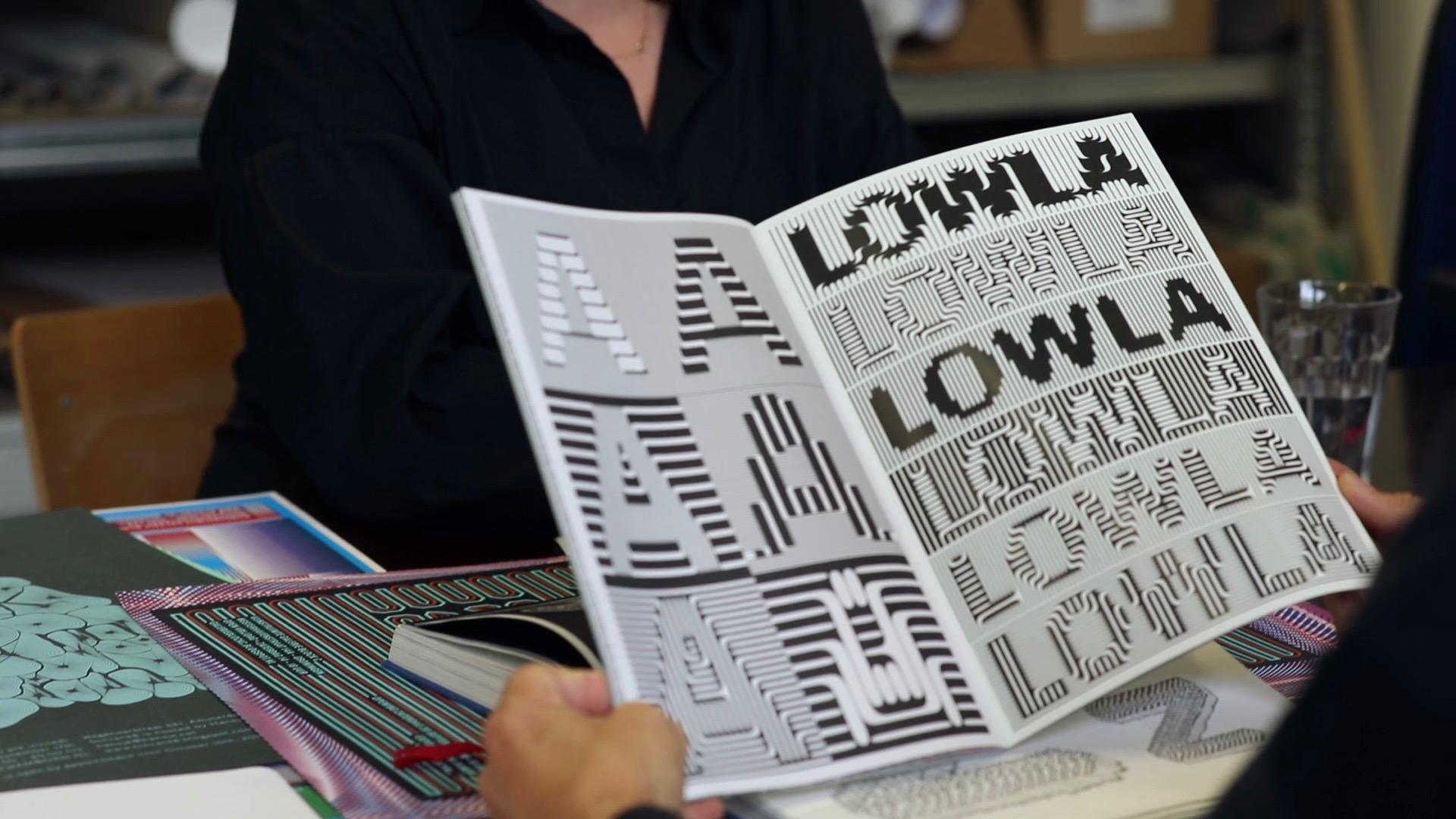
A selection of graphic designs by Hansje van Halem for the Lowlands festival.

== Editions ==
Note: the organisation of Lowlands considers 1993 the official first edition. Prices before the introduction of the euro on 1 January 2002 have been converted from guilders to euros. The 2020 and 2021 editions of Lowlands were cancelled due to the COVID-19 pandemic.

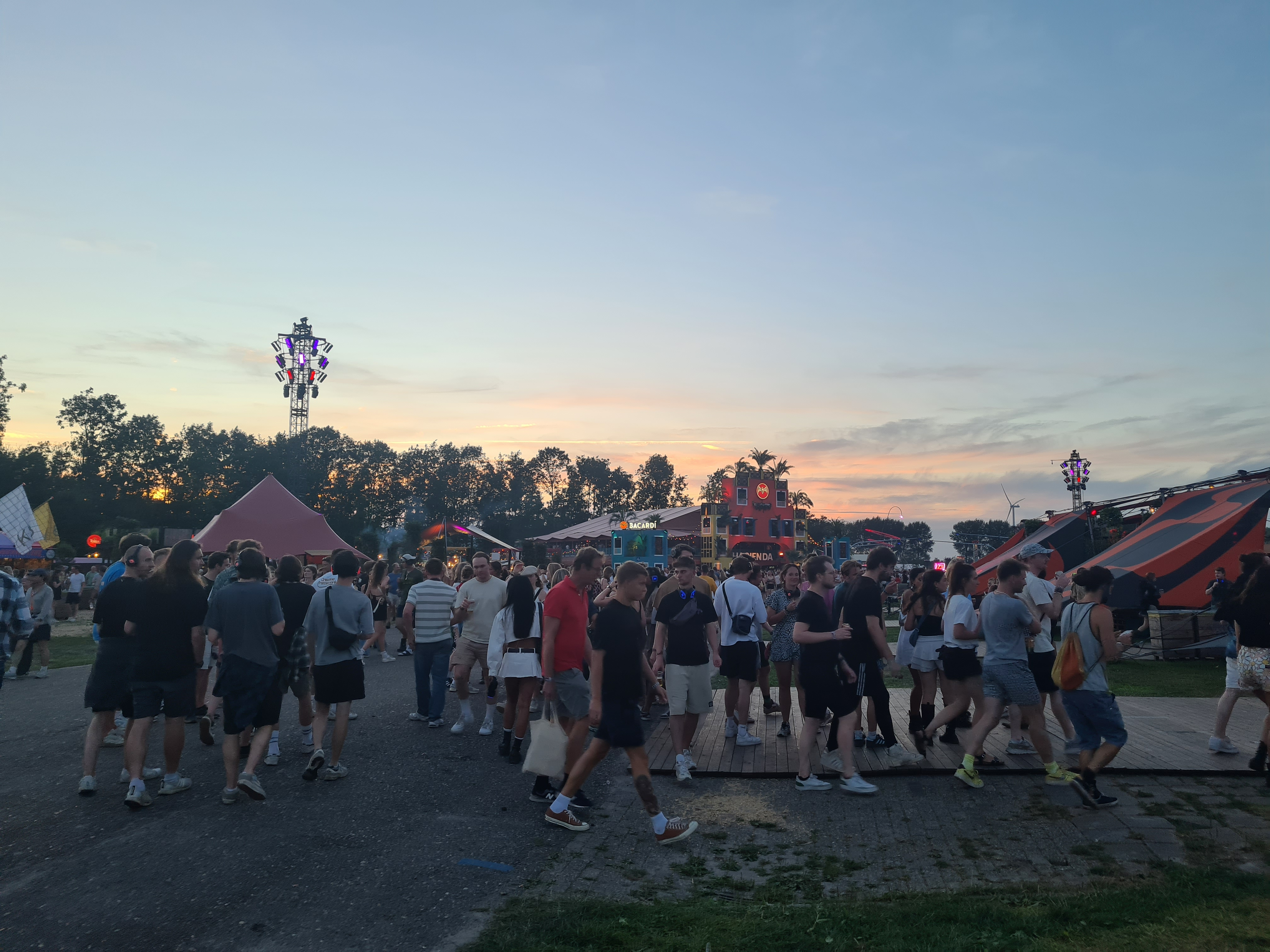
People walking in front of the Hacienda stage.

Edition	Year	Dates	Headliners	Token price (euros)	Ticket price (euros)	Attendance or Sales
1st	1967	24, 25 November	Golden Earring; Arthur Brown	—N/a	€4,50	8,000
2nd	1968	28, 29 December	Pink Floyd; MC5	—N/a	€4,50	18,000
3rd	1993	27, 28, 29 August	Big Star; Rage Against the Machine; Iggy Pop	€1,20	€34	7,800
4th	1994	26, 27, 28 August	Life of Agony; Jeff Buckley; Cypress Hill; The Offspring	€1,15	€43	12,500
5th	1995	25, 26, 27 August	Foo Fighters; Green Day; The Prodigy; The Chemical Brothers	€1,15	€52	20,000
6th	1996	23, 24, 25 August	Dick Dale; Ice-T	€1,23	€63,50	30,000
7th	1997	22, 23, 24 August	Life of Agony; The Chemical Brothers; Blink-182	€1,25	€65,79	40,000
8th	1998	28, 29, 30 August	Green Day; Beastie Boys; Fatboy Slim; Elliott Smith	€1,27	€68	45,000
9th	1999	27, 28, 29 August	Dropkick Murphys; The Chemical Brothers; The Offspring	€1,32	€73	55,000
10th	2000	25, 26, 27 August	Muse; Osdorp Posse; Cypress Hill	€1,36	€79,50	57,500
11th	2001	24, 25, 26 August	System of a Down; The Prodigy; Placebo; Muse	€1,59	€88,50	57,500
12th	2002	23, 24, 25 August	Nickelback; Tiësto	€1,75	€97,50	60,000
13th	2003	29, 30, 31 August	Kings of Leon; Foo Fighters	€1,85	€107,50	48,000
14th	2004	20, 21, 22 August	Faithless; Bloodhound Gang; Danko Jones	€2,00	€115	52,000
15th	2005	19, 20, 21 August	The Prodigy; Marilyn Manson; Nightwish; Foo Fighters	€2,00	€115	53,000
16th	2006	18, 19, 20 August	Placebo; Massive Attack; Muse	€2,10	€117,50	55,000
17th	2007	17, 18, 19 August	The Killers; Kaiser Chiefs; Kings of Leon	€2,20	€125	55,000
18th	2008	15, 16, 17 August	Anouk; Underworld; Editors	€2,30	€135	55,000
19th	2009	21, 22, 23 August	The Prodigy; Arctic Monkeys; Kaiser Chiefs	€2,40	€140	55,000
20th	2010	20, 21, 22 August	Blink 182; Mumford & Sons; Queens of the Stone Age	€2,50	€145	55,000
21st	2011	19, 20, 21 August	Arctic Monkeys; Elbow; The Offspring	€2,50	€155	57,500
22nd	2012	17, 18, 19 August	Foo Fighters; Skrillex; The Black Keys	€2,60	€175	55,000
23rd	2013	16, 17, 18 August	Editors; Nine Inch Nails; Nick Cave & The Bad Seeds	€2,60	€175	55,000
24th	2014	15, 16, 17 August	Disclosure; Stromae; Queens of the Stone Age	€2,60	€185	55,000
25th	2015	21, 22, 23 August	The Chemical Brothers; Ben Howard; Major Lazer	€2,60	€185	48,206
26th	2016	19, 20, 21 August	Muse; Disclosure; LCD Soundsystem	€2,60	€185	50,216
27th	2017	18, 19, 20 August	Iggy Pop; The xx; Sean Paul	€2,75	€185	55,000
28th	2018	17, 18, 19 August	Gorillaz; The War on Drugs; Kendrick Lamar	€2,80	€195	60,000
29th	2019	16, 17, 18 August	Tame Impala; Twenty One Pilots; The National; Billie Eilish; Royal Blood	€2,90	€200	60,000
Cancelled	2020	21, 22, 23 August	Lewis Capaldi; The Chemical Brothers; Stormzy; Liam Gallagher; Bring Me the Horizon	N/A	€220	N/A
Cancelled	2021	20, 21, 22 August	N/A	N/A	€220	N/A
30th	2022	19, 20, 21 August	Arctic Monkeys; Stromae; Bring Me the Horizon	€3,30	€255	65,000
31st	2023	18, 19, 20 August	Billie Eilish; Charlotte de Witte; Foals; Nothing but Thieves; Underworld	€3,50	€300	65,000
32nd	2024	16, 17, 18 August	Justice; Fred Again; Nas; Sugababes; Goldband	€3,75	€325	65,000
33rd	2025	15, 16, 17 August	Job Jobse; Raye; Chappell Roan; Fontaines D.C.; Jamie xx	Coinless – Payment by card (small beer price €3,90) (Note: Historically, the price of a small beer at Lowlands was equivalent to the cost of one festival token. In 2025, the price of a small beer was €3.90, representing a 4% increase compared to the 2024 token price of €3.75.)	€349	65,000
