= Balaton Sound =

Hungarian electronic music festival

Coordinates: 46°53′2.55″N 17°55′31.43″E

- Genre: Electronic music, pop, hip hop, world music, new wave music, neo soul
- Dates: Four days, usually starting on the second Thursday of July
- Location: / Zamárdi / Lake Balaton / Hungary
- Years active: 2007 – 2024
- Attendance: 172,000 (2019)
- Capacity: 140,000
- Website: https://balatonsound.com/en/

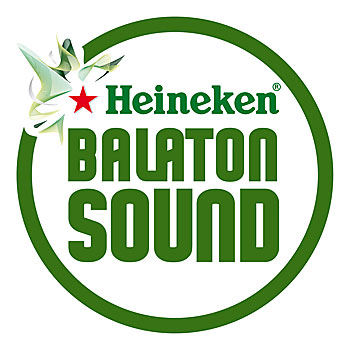
Balaton Sound

Balaton Sound (also known as Heineken Balaton Sound between 2007 and 2012 and as MasterCard Balaton Sound since 2013 for sponsorship reasons) was one of Europe's largest open air electronic music festivals. Held annually since 2007 on the southern bank of Lake Balaton, Hungary, it featured live acts and DJs from all around the world, from established artists to new names. The event was co-created by the organizers of Sziget Festival.

== Background ==
The first Balaton Sound festival was held between 12 July and 15 July 2007. The fact that the event was held on the shore of the largest lake in Central Europe in mid-summer, its twenty-hour music schedule and the line-up gained it significant public interest.

The festival was located in the western part of Zamárdi, on a 2.5 kilometre stretch of public beach.

Inside the festival area, a variety of stages, lounges, and tents were established for performances. The sponsors of the festival created luxurious chill-out facilities with hammocks, bean bags, and easy chairs. Visitors to Balaton Sound could stay at a special campsites with several pubs, cocktail bars and restaurants equipped with accoutrements absent from Hungary's other summer music festivals. The Main Stage area had a capacity of about 50,000.

According to a KPMG study over the four days of the event in 2008, 88,000 attendants visited the festival while the daily average reached 22,000. Over 1.6 billion HUF was spent by visitors in total, 41,000 HUF per person, mostly spent on entrance fees, food and accommodation. In 2009, the number of festival visitors reached 94,000. In 2012 it became the second largest music festival in Hungary (after the Sziget Festival), and one of the most populated electronic music festivals in Europe.

The 2012 festival won the European Festivals Award in the category Best Medium-Sized European Festival in early 2013.

In 2018 the festival headliners included (amongst others) David Guetta, Alesso, Dimitri Vegas & Like Mike and The Chainsmokers. A statement by the festival producers confirmed that the 2018 festival broke its previous attendance record, with 165,000 attending, 8000 more than the previous record.

In 2016, 157,000 people visited the festival. 165,000 in 2018 and in 2019, 172,000. All three years broke attendance records.

The festival was postponed in 2020 and 2021 due to the Covid-19 pandemic.

Following the 2024 event, rumours began to circulate around the future of the festival and that the given year was the final occasion that it would take place. These were later confirmed by the mayor of Zamárdi, Gyula Csákovics, who stated that the town no longer wished to another Balaton Sound in Zamárdi from 2025 onwards, nor would they host any other major music festival instead.

Pre-sale ticket prices:

	2007	2008	2009	2010	2011	2012	2013	2014	2015
Daily ticket	6000HUF	28EUR/ 6990HUF	39EUR/ 9900HUF	50EUR/ 12500HUF	46EUR/ 12500HUF	45EUR/ 13000HUF	55EUR/ 15000HUF	50EUR/ 15000HUF	55EUR/ 16000HUF
Festival pass (4/5 days)	14900HUF	69EUR/ 16900HUF	100EUR/ 25000HUF	110EUR/ 29900HUF	111EUR/ 29900HUF	110EUR/ 31000HUF	135EUR/ 39000HUF	150EUR/ 44000HUF	165EUR/ 49990HUF

== Line-ups ==
The following were the festival line-ups for 2007, 2008, 2009, and 2013.

2007:

	July 12	July 13	July 14	July 15
Stage Fever Arena	(Hungary) Junkie & Hawkie; (Hungary) Kühl; (United Kingdom) Darren Emerson; (Sweden) Eric Prydz; (Hungary) Sterbinszky	(Hungary) Junkie & Hawkie; (United Kingdom) Client; (Hungary) Muzzaik; (United States) Roger Sanchez; (Netherlands) Ferry Corsten; (Hungary) Shane 54	(Hungary) Junkie & Hawkie; (Hungary) Pöli; (Netherlands) Junkie XL; (Argentina) Hernan Cattaneo; (Hungary) Slam Jr	
Main Stage		(Hungary) Belga; (Hungary) Hiperkarma, Patrice; (Hungary) Anima Sound System; (United Kingdom) Basement Jaxx	(Hungary) Emil.RuleZ!; (United States) Leeroy (Saian Supa Crew); (United Kingdom) Oi Va Oi; (United Kingdom) The Brand New Heavies; (Austria) Kruder & Dorfmeister	(Hungary) PASO; (United States) Beastie Boys
T-Mobile- LG Stage	(Hungary) DJ Viki; (Hungary) Mitsura; (Hungary) Quimby; (Hungary) Kispál és a Borz; (Austria) Bauchklang; (Hungary) Yonderboi; (Hungary) DJ Cadik	(Hungary) DJ Viki; (Hungary) Keyser & Shuriken; (Hungary) Bootsie Quartet; (Hungary) Barabás Lőrinc Eklektric; (Hungary) Zagar; (Austria) Madrid De Los Austrias; (France) Nouvelle Vague; (United Kingdom) Adam Freeland; (Hungary) Palotai	(Hungary) DJ Viki; (United Kingdom) Dave Tipper; (Hungary) Colorstar; (Spain) José Padilla; (Hungary) Fine Cut Bodies; (Canada) DJ Storm; (Hungary) Bal & Size9	(Hungary) DJ Viki; (Hungary) Dj Shuriken; (Hungary) Singas Projekt; (Hungary) Irie Maffia; (Hungary) Zagastic; (Hungary) Brains; (Hungary) Neo; (Canada) Tiga; (Hungary) Hot X

2008:

	July 10	July 11	July 12	July 13
T-Mobile Stage	(Hungary) Andre, Naga, Beta; (Germany) M.A.N.D.Y.; (Hungary) Polymorphin	(Austria) URBS DJ set; Re: Jazz; (Argentina) Federico Aubele ft. Natalie Clavier; (Sweden) Koop; (Hungary) Hot X; (Canada) Richie Hawtin; (Hungary) Igor Do Urden	(Italy) Nicola Conte DJ set; (Spain) José Padilla; (Italy) Nicola Conte Jazz Combo; (Hungary) Erik Sumo Band; (Chile) Ricardo Tobar live; (United Kingdom) James Holden; (Hungary) Coyote	(Hungary) Negro @ The Uptown Felaz; (Hungary) Karányi; (Finland) Jimi Tenor & Kabu Kabu; (Mexico) Los De Abajo
Heineken Main Stage		(United Kingdom) Goldfrapp; (Hungary) Quimby, (United Kingdom) Massive Attack	(Cuba) Orishas; (Germany) Gentleman; (United States) The B-52's	(France) Sergent Garcia; (Hungary) Zagar feat. Underground Divas; (United Kingdom) Fatboy Slim
Red Lounge	(Hungary) Irie Maffia; (Hungary) Péterfy Bori & Love Band; (Hungary) Colorstar; (Hungary) Rewind - Palotai; (Hungary) Cadik, Mc Zeek, Publo, Chiburi, Lee	(Hungary) Mike_Rosoft&DJ Mesterházy; (Hungary) Bootsie Quartet; (Hungary) Beat Dis; (Hungary) Barabás Lőrinc Eklektric; (Austria) Deladap!; (Austria) Russkaja; (Hungary) Ltj Bukem & MC Conrad; (Hungary) Anima DJ set	(Hungary) The Transform Quintet; (Hungary) Tape Underground; (Hungary) Singas Project; (Hungary) Varga Zsuzsa; (Belgium) Buscemi; (Hungary) Neo; (United Kingdom) Krafty Kuts; (Hungary) DJ Marka	(Hungary) Rozsnyói Trió; (Hungary) Anselmo Crew; (Hungary) Carbonfools; (Hungary) Anima Sound System; (Hungary) Fine Cut Bodies; (United Kingdom) DJ Hype & Daddy Earl
Samsung Mobil Arena		(Hungary) Junkie & Hawky; (United Kingdom) Mylo; (Austria) Observer; (Netherlands) Armin Van Buuren; (Hungary) Sterbinszky	(Hungary) Junkie & Hawky; (Hungary) Pöli; (Germany) Booka Shade; (France) David Guetta; (Hungary) Muzzaik	(Hungary) Junkie & Hawky; (Hungary) Chriss; (Japan) Satoshi Tomiie; (Hungary) Kühl

2009:

	July 9	July 10	July 11	July 12
T-Mobile Stage	(Hungary) Cogita, Andras Toth, Duel; (Germany) Singas Project; (Hungary) Beat Dis; (Hungary) Realistic Crew; (Finland) The Five Corners Quintet; (Hungary) Junkie&Hawky	(Austria) URBS DJ set; Re: Jazz; (Argentina) Federico Aubele ft. Natalie Clavier; (Sweden) Koop; (Hungary) Hot X; (Germany) Sven Väth; (Hungary) Igor Do Urden	(Italy) Nicola Conte DJ set; (Spain) José Padilla; (Italy) Nicola Conte Jazz Combo; (Hungary) Erik Sumo Band; (Chile) Ricardo Tobar live; (United Kingdom) James Holden; (Hungary) Coyote	(Hungary) Negro @ The Uptown Felaz; (Hungary) Karányi; (Finland) Jimi Tenor & Kabu Kabu; (Mexico) Los De Abajo
Heineken Main Stage	(Hungary) Headshotboyz, Newl, Tits&Clits; (United Kingdom) Dub Pistols; (France) Nouvelle Vague; (United Kingdom) Underworld	(Hungary) Detective Kelly, Rene Mascarpone&Wachter, Streako, Sikztah; (United States) Ozomatli; (Hungary) Neo; (Germany) Kraftwerk	(Hungary) We plants are happy plants, Kollektiva; (Spain) Eskorzo; (Hungary) Brains; (United Kingdom) Orbital	(Hungary) NVC: Zoidberg, Ioda, Subotage, Tempo; (Hungary) Irie Maffia; (Norway) Röyksopp; (United States) Moby
Pesti Est Stage	(Hungary) Mesterhazy; (Hungary) Korai Öröm; (Hungary) Colorstar; (Hungary) Pannonia Allstars Ska Orchestra; (Hungary) Demon Superior; (Hungary) Mad Professor, I Ration, Mc Kemon	(Hungary) Mesterházy; (Hungary) Blue Note Cafe/Maestro; (Hungary) Nostalgia 77; (Hungary) Péterfy Bori&Loveband; (Hungary) Soerii &Poolek; (Hungary) Fine Cut Bodies; (Canada) Mstrkrft, Anima DJ set, Bergi	(Hungary) Mesterházy; (Hungary) Blue Note Cafe/Maestro; (Hungary) Sadant; (Hungary) Goulasch Exotika; (Hungary) Black Cherry; (Hungary) Anima Sound System; (Hungary) Sub Focus, Chris.su	(Hungary) Mesterházy; (Hungary) Blue Note Cafe/Maestro; (Hungary) Harcsa Veronika; (Hungary) Anselmo Crew; (Hungary) Bootsie Quartet; (Hungary) Erik Sumo Band; (Hungary) DJ Zinc, Bal
Samsung Mobil Arena	(Hungary) Junkie & Hawky; (Hungary) Collins&Behnam; (Czech Republic) Lucca; (United Kingdom) Carl Cox; (Hungary) Hot X	(Hungary) Junkie & Hawky; (Hungary) Chriss; (Austria) Dennes Deen; (France) David Guetta; (Hungary) Sterbinszky	(Hungary) Junkie & Hawky; (Hungary) Szeifert; (Spain) Richard Gray; (United States) Eric Morillo; (Hungary) Muzzaik	(Hungary) Sanfranciscobeat; (Hungary) Reecoba; (Canada) Richie Hawtin, Hearthrob, Magda
MR2/MOL Stage	(Hungary) Mustbeat crew; (Hungary) Lollipop/Radiokraft; (Hungary) Gumipop: Gasman; (Hungary) Monkey6; (Hungary) Hairy:Naga, Beta; (Austria) Parov Stelar&Max the sax; (Hungary) Mecca events: 30HZ, Sikztah, Metha	(Hungary) Love alliance; (Hungary) Dub phaze; (Hungary) Ninjabreakz; (Hungary) Kollektiva; (Hungary) MR2 Dj set: Titusz; (Hungary) MR2 Dj set: Izil; (Hungary) MR2 Dj set: Palotai	(Hungary) Bomb the Jazz; (Hungary) Girls and Mathematics; (Hungary) Bladerunnaz/Test; (Hungary) Chi Recordings: AMB, Kodek, Synus0006, Anorganik Aka Raster, Mango live; (United States) Justin Martin, Oliver$; (Hungary) MR2 DJ set: Fine Cut Bodies	(Hungary) Deaf Company; (Hungary) No Vidra Crew; (Hungary) MR2 DJ set: Karányi, Rob; (Hungary) Lick the Click; (Hungary) Hypnosis; (Hungary) Allnightbreakz

2013:

	July 10	July 11	July 12	July 13	July 14
OTP Bank Stage	(Hungary) Edo Denova; (Hungary) Lotfi Begi; (Hungary) Roberto; (Germany) Moguai; (Hungary) Flamemakers	(Hungary) Ganxsta Zolee és a Kartel; (Hungary) Akkezdet Phiai; (Netherlands) Baskerville (NL) live; (Hungary) Irie Maffia; (Italy) The Bloody Beetroots; (Hungary) Dublic; (Italy) Belzebass; (Hungary) Robotrock; (Hungary) Kovary	(Hungary) Bëlga; (Hungary) Bin-Jip; (Hungary) Neo; (United Kingdom) Modestep; (Hungary) Vad Fruttik; (Hungary) Matt-U & MC Kemon; (United Kingdom) FuntCase; (United Kingdom) Doctor P; (Hungary) Palotai & MC Fedora, Dublic	(Hungary) Sonar; (Hungary) Sena; (Hungary) Žagar; (Hungary) Karányi anthology; (Hungary) Brains; (Hungary) Ludmilla; (Belgium) Dimitri Vegas & Like Mike; (Hungary) Wondawulf; (Hungary) B`Andre	(Hungary) Soerii & Poolek; (Hungary) Pannonia Allstars Ska Orchestra; (Hungary) Odett; (Hungary) Carbonfools; (United Kingdom) Four Tet; (Hungary) Fine Cut Bodies - "LA PETITE MORT" A/V show; (Brazil) Amon Tobin presents Two Fingers; (United Kingdom) Friction; (Hungary) Chris.su
MasterCard Main Stage		(Hungary) Warm Up - Canard; (Canada) Crystal Castles; (United States) Wu-Tang Clan; (Sweden) Avicii	(Hungary) Warm Up - DJ Gozth; (United States) Nas; (Netherlands) Afrojack; (Germany) Freelusion Interactive; (Netherlands) Armin Van Buuren	(Hungary) Warm Up - Paul Strive; (Hungary) Punnany Elektro; (United States) Steve Aoki; (United Kingdom) The Prodigy	(Hungary) Warm Up - Nikola; (United Kingdom) Above and Beyond; (Netherlands) Fedde le Grand; (United Kingdom) Calvin Harris
Arena		(Hungary) Metha; (Hungary) Stereo Killaz; (Hungary) Sikztah; (France) Justice DJ set; (France) Brodinski; (Hungary) Andro	(Hungary) Stereopalma; (Hungary) Karmatronic; (Australia) Nervo; (Netherlands) Hardwell; (Sweden) Dada Life; (Hungary) Sterbinszky	(Hungary) Kühl; (Hungary) Jay Lumen; (Hungary) Julia Carpenter; (Sweden) Alesso; (Sweden) Axwell; (Hungary) Muzzaik	(Hungary) Sanfranciscobeat; (Italy) Minicoolboyz; (Hungary) Hot X; (United Kingdom) Slam; (United States) Green Velvet; (United Kingdom) The Advent; (United Kingdom) Gary Beck
Telekom Terasz		(Hungary) Eva Live; (Hungary) Volkova Sisters; (Norway) Todd Terje; (Hungary) Naga & Beta; (United Kingdom) Scuba; (Germany) Solomun; (Hungary) Secret Factory a.k.a. Junkie & Hawky	(Hungary) Zajac; (Hungary) Plastikheaven live; (Hungary) 20 years Anima DJs; (Sweden) Jan Blomqvist; (Hungary) Budai; (Germany) Henrik Schwartz; (Germany) Dixon; (United States) Seth Troxler; (Hungary) Coyote	(Hungary) Reecoba; (Hungary) Invoice; (Hungary) Erpelpelle live; (Hungary) Bernáthy Zsiga live; (France) Bruno from Ibiza; (Hungary) Chriss Ronson; (Argentina) Hernán Cattáneo; (Canada) Fairmont; (United Kingdom) Jamie Jones; (Hungary) Dandy	(Hungary) Yvel & Tristan; (Hungary) We Plants Are Happy Plants; (Hungary) Compact Disco; (Germany) DJ Koze; (Hungary) Nora Naughty & Roocha; (Poland) Magda; (Germany) tINI; (Germany) Loco Dice; (Hungary) Poli & Polarize

2018

Dimitri Vegas & Like Mike, The Chainsmokers, Martin Garrix, NERVO, Timmy Trumpet, W&W, David Guetta, DJ Snake, TY Dolla $ign, Jonas Blue

== Picture gallery ==
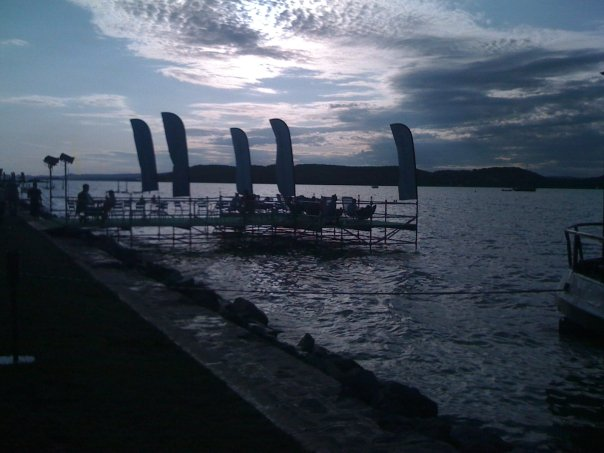
View of the lake by sunset. Tired attendants can relax on the pier built by the main sponsor, Heineken.

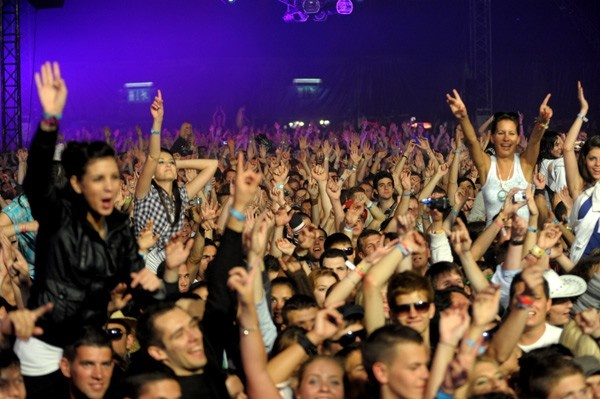
High point of the party inside the Samsung Mobile Arena while David Guetta performs

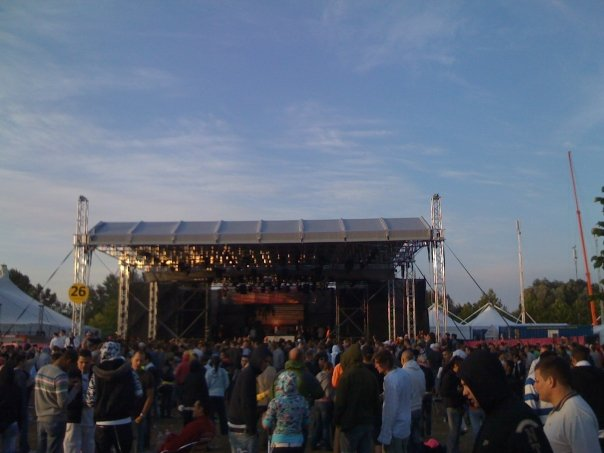
Radio1 stage, late afternoon on the third day of the festival

== See also ==
- List of electronic music festivals
