= Metal Hammer Paradise =

Music festival in Germany

Metal Hammer Paradise is an annual indoor metal music festival located at the holyday park 'Weissenhaeuser Strand' near the city of Kiel at the baltic sea in Germany. It first took place in 2012 and is presented by the music magazine Metal Hammer. The festival takes place in November of each year, attracting an audience of about 4,000.
