= Artmania Festival =

Art festival held in Sibiu, Romania

ARTmania Festival Sibiu
- Genre: Heavy metal
- Dates: August
- Locations: Sibiu, Romania
- Years active: 2006 - present
- Website: www.artmaniafestival.ro

The Artmania Festival (stylized as ARTmaИ!a Festival) is a music and art festival, held in Sibiu, a town in Romania. The festival, one of the most important projects developed by ARTmania, was first organized in the summer of 2006 and has been held every summer since.

The main attraction of the festival is the music: bands perform in the Large Square (Piaţa Mare) during the first two days weekend of the festival. Major bands have performed at the festival including Nightwish, HIM, Opeth, Amorphis, Anathema, Lacrimosa, Tiamat, My Dying Bride and Within Temptation and the festival grows each year.

The ARTmania Festival also features other cultural events, such as visual art exhibitions, museum exhibitions, film screenings, classical music performances, lectures, workshops and parties.

The Sibiu annual festival has established a reputation for showcasing gothic metal artists and various other metal genres, expanding its scope to encompass heavy metal, punk, and alternative rock. Music serves as the central theme of the festival, with a strong emphasis on visual arts, particularly photography and painting.

ARTmania Festival won two important awards. In 2020, ARTmania Festival was named winner of "The Award for Excellence & Passion" at the 11th edition of the European Festival Awards. This is after 2018, when the festival was awarded the "Best Small Festival" category at the European Festival Awards.

== Concerts along the years ==
=== 2025 ===
Performing artists/band were:

- Dream Theater
- Extreme (band)
- Sylvaine
- Vestige (band)
- Eihwar (band)

=== 2024 ===
Performing artists/band were, among others:

- Korn
- Spiritbox
- Satyricon
- Igorrr
- Borknagar
- The Flower Kings
- Monuments

=== 2023 ===
Performing artists/band were, among others:

- Porcupine Tree
- Wardruna
- Emperor
- Samael
- TesseracT
- Pain Of Salvation
- Haken
- Sirenia

=== 2022 ===
Performing artists/band were, among others:

- Mercyful Fate
- Meshuggah
- Transatlantic
- Testament
- Cult Of Luna
- My Dying Bride
- Leprous
- The Pineapple Thief
- The Vintage Caravan

=== 2019 ===
Performing artists/band were, among others:

- Dream Theater
- Opeth
- Madrugada
- Wardruna
- Architects
- Alcest

=== 2018 ===
Performing artists/band were, among others:

- Mogwai
- Steven Wilson
- Leprous
- Haken
- Zeal & Ardor
- Arcane Roots
- Rome
- Distorted Harmony

=== 2017 ===
Performing artists/band were, among others:

- Tarja
- You Me at Six
- Devin Townsend Project
- Lacuna Coil
- Riverside
- Beyond the Black

=== 2016 ===
Performing artists/band were, among others:

- Ihsahn
- Pain of Salvation
- Sólstafir
- Black Peaks
- The Foreshadowing
- Fantazia

=== 2015 ===
Performing artists/band were, among others:

- Anathema
- Apocalyptica
- Saturnus
- Clan of Xymox

=== 2014 ===
Performing artists/band were, among others:

- Rage
- Therion
- Eluveitie
- Diary of Dreams
- Equilibrium
- Rîul Doamnei
- Zdob și Zdub
- Alternosfera
- Peter Hammill
- Hauschka
- Daemonia Nymphe
- 65daysofstatic
- EF

=== 2013 ===
Performing artists/band were, among others:

- Within Temptation
- Lacrimosa
- Haggard
- Orphaned Land
- Deine Lakaien
- Amaranthe
- Xandria
- Alternosfera

=== 2012 ===
Performing artists/band were, among others:

- Die Toten Hosen
- My Dying Bride
- Edguy
- Epica
- Deathstars
- Delain
- Poets of the Fall
- Trail of Tears
- Alternosfera

=== 2011 ===
Performing artists/band were, among others:

- Tarja
- Helloween
- Sonata Arctica
- Lacrimas Profundere
- Lacuna Coil
- Republica

=== 2010 ===
Performing artists/band were, among others:

- Serj Tankian
- The Sisters of Mercy
- Kamelot
- Sirenia
- Dark Tranquillity
- Swallow the Sun
- ACT
- Grimus

=== 2009 ===
Performing artists/band were, among others:

- Nightwish
- Pain
- Tristania
- Opeth
- My Dying Bride
- Luna Amară

=== 2008 ===
Performing artists/band were, among others:

- Lacrimosa
- Gamma Ray
- Atrocity
- Tiamat
- Negură Bunget
- Leaves' Eyes
- Agua de Annique

=== 2007 ===
Performing artists/band were, among others:

- Within Temptation
- My Dying Bride
- Anathema
- The Gathering
- Haggard
- Tarot
- Iris
- Cargo
- Celelalte Cuvinte

=== 2006 ===
Performing artists/band were, among others:

- HIM
- Amorphis
- Luna Amara
- Silentium
- Altar
- Kumm
- Carmen Gray

== Visual Arts Exhibitions ==
All exhibitions Romanian, unless otherwise stated.

=== 2014 ===
- (United States) "What I dream" by Julieanne Kost
- (United States) "Childhood fears" by Joshua Hoffine

=== 2013 ===
- "7 days and 7 nights" - by Roman Tolici at Habitus Cultural Centre - The art exhibition brings into the spotlight fragments of the projections of the world, of life and death.
- "From White to Black" - an exhibition signed by Ioana Popescu. The young artist bring to Sibiu a black and white photo collection illustrating a minutious capture of the human feelings, dreams, hopes and uncertainties.
- "Galateca presents a selection of engravings, drawings, photo collage, watercolors and bibliophile books by internationally renowned artists: Simon Henwood, Mircea Roman, Mircea Nechita and Edward Gorey.

=== 2012 ===
- Ingeri (Angels) by Adrian Alexandru Ilfoveanu at Habitus Cultural Centre - bronze and wooden sculpture exhibition
- (European Union) Amazing Universe - 50 years of ESO, astronomical images/photo exhibition.
- Festival Scraps - concert photography exhibition by Alex and Andreea Lupascu at Art Cafe in the Large Square.
- Sorin Dumitrescu - Mihaesti - painting exhibition, ART Vo Gallery

=== 2011 ===
- Din Adancuri (From the Deep) by Anda Cofaru at the Habitus Cultural Centre – exhibition inspired by Tarja Turunen’s music
- “Rock Memorandum” by Diana and Doina Pantea – exhibition at the Habitus Cultural Centre
- the photographic exhibition ARTnatomy- The Reconfiguring Eye, by Miluta Flueras at the Artists’ Café, ArtCafe in the Large Square
- Live Aeons exhibition by Victor Cristescu and Dumitru Catalin - a collection of photographs

=== 2010 ===
- Neo-gothic living vs. The Age of Enlightenment Model – exhibition at the Brukenthal Museum
- ARTmania Festival in images – photo exhibition hosted by tourist information Center
- (Sweden) Ichtys” Paintings by Niklas Sundin (DT) – hosted by Bohemian Flow

=== 2009 ===
- (United Kingdom) “From A Dark Mind” Photo exhibition – offered by Aaron Stainthorpe (MY DYING BRIDE) hosted by Habitus Center
- “Toymania" Exhibition – visual arts exhibition of Romanian artist Daniel Turcu hosted by the Contemporary Art Gallery
- LIVE on canvas – visual arts show & exhibition by Anda Cofaru Romanian visual artist hosted by Mayoralty Lobby
- Colorful images – animated films projections by Mihai Badica Romanian visual artist hosted by Art Cafe

=== 2008 ===
- (Finland) Jan Kaila visual arts exhibition hosted by the Brukenthal Museum of Sibiu. Jan Kaila is Head of the Post-university Studies Department from the Academy of Fine Arts of Helsinki and has a PHd in visual arts
- (Finland) ELINA BROTHERUS visual arts exhibition hosted by the Brukenthal Museum of Sibiu. Elina Broherus one of the most “en vogue” artistic figures of today’s international artistic world.
- Romanian Arts Exhibition – visual arts exhibition of several Romanian artists hosted by the Contemporary Art Museum of Sibiu

== Literature events ==
All events Romanian.

== 2014 ==
- "In cautarea fericirii" de Manu Anghelescu
- Poezie - Claudiu Komartin & Vlad Pojoga
- "Sick Rose" - Luna Miguel & Catalina Stanislav
- Concert Stefana Fratila
- Acluofobia - A. R. Deleanu
- Arta Sunetelor
- Escapada - Lavinia Braniste
- "Vom tacea, vom strange din dinti" cu Krista Szocs si Aleksandar Stoicovici
- "Tripuri, eroi si metode" cu Florentin Popa si Vlad Dragoi

=== 2013 ===
- "Urban Comics made in Cluj" - a comic album inspired by urban legends. The comic books are available in Romania and German.
- Bookaholic - "How do we read in the digital era?" - we will try to find the answer with the writers Cecilia Stefanescu, Florin Iaru, Paul Balogh (specialist in digital publishing) in a meeting moderated by Cristina Foarfa and organized by Bookaholic.ro.
- Press @ school - a debate about what journalism means to the new generation, about what it means to write, to take interviews, to find attractive topics, to make people read; a debate about people you should listen to, about the people you should bring close to you; about the borderline between reportage and art.
- "ARTmaniere Poetice #2" - contemporary poetry read by Claudiu Komartin, Vlad Pojora, Ilinca Pop and Catalina Stanislav. Ana Toma's piano will double the entire period of the reading.

=== 2012 ===
- Artmaniere poetice. Contemporary poetry read by Rita Chirian, Claudiu Komartin, Vlad Pojoga and Radu Vancu (the new Romanian literary generation), at Habitus Gallery, Sibiu.
- Novel presentation ”Namaste”, by Sega, at Humanitas Library, Sibiu.

=== 2011 ===
- Launch of “Room mates. Student in Chisinau” novel by Mihail Vakulovski – in Large Square, Sibiu

=== 2010 ===
- Launch of “Bazar bizar” novel by Radu Paraschivescu – at Astra Library in Sibiu
- Launch of “Fotbalistic manifest” of Traian Ungureanu – at Astra Library in Sibiu

== Classical music Concerts & other genre ==
All events Romanian, unless otherwise stated.

=== 2014 ===
- (United Kingdom) Peter Hammill acoustic concert at Brukenthal Palace, Large Square. The most influential and impressive progressive rock voice of all time has mesmerized the audience at ARTmania Festival 2014 in an exclusive solo performance.
- (Germany) The legendary piano innovator, Hauschka concerted at the Gong Theatre, Sibiu.
- Daemonia Nymphe, the contemporary NeoFolk treasure from Greece, came to Sibiu and performed at the Gong Theatre during ARTmania Festival 2014.
- (Poland) Tides From Nebula, one of the best Post-Rock bands in Europe, performed at ARTmania Festival on the Altemberger stage.
- (United Kingdom) 65daysofstatic offered a unique experience on Thursday, August 7, in Sibiu, during ARTmania Festival.
- (Sweden) Growth. Experiment. Focus. These are the 3 key words for one of Europe’s hardest working and continuously promising acts who performed at ARTmania Festival Sibiu. EF concert, at Altemberger Stage.

=== 2013 ===
- (Germany) Deine Lakaien acoustic concert - at Brukenthal Palace Large Square. The great representatives of the avant garde of electronic music came to ARTmania Festival with an intense performance, full of emotions. Supported by Bosch Rexroth.

=== 2012 ===
- Fado Concert by Maria Raducanu and Portuguese text lecture by Mihai Alexandru at Habitus Gallery. Supported by Instituto Camoes of Bucharest.

=== 2011 ===
- Guilty Lemon concert – jazz concert hosted by Art Cafe.

=== 2010 ===
- Classical music Festival-Contest „Carl Filtsch” - piano concerts and classical music recitals offered by young Romanian artists in Thalia music hall of Sibiu
- “Carl Filtsch” Gala concert – offered by the winners of the “Carl Filtsch” classical music contest in Thalia music hall of Sibiu

== Film screening ==
All events Romanian, unless otherwise stated.

=== 2014 ===
- "Shivers 1" powered by Dracula International Film Festival.
- "Shivers 2" powered by Dracula International Film Festival.
- "Shivers 3" powered by Dracula International Film Festival.
- (United States) "House of Dracula" powered by Dracula International Film Festival.
- (United States) "Dracula's Daughter" powered by Dracula International Film Festival.

=== 2013 ===
- Full Moon Preview 2013 - at Habitus Gallery. Presented 4 fantastic short-films that oscillates between absurd and macabre.
- (Poland) Political Dress powered by The Polish Institute - at Habitus Gallery.
- Child's Pose - in premiere at Sibiu - at Habitus Gallery. Directed by Calin Peter Netzer, is a film about the traumas of children suffocated by love and about the marks that parents leave upon their children's personality.
- Rocker - powered by Transilvania Film - at Habitus Gallery. Directed by Marian Crisan.
- Killing Time - in premiere at Sibiu - at Habitus Gallery. Directed by Florin Piersic Jr. Plot: two robbers await their next victim in an empty apartment. The hour pass. Tension rises. Innocent jokes turn into taunts. Insults become threats. Blood will flow.
- Life Principles - at Habitus Gallery. A film by Constantin Popescu. Screening supported by PARADA Film.
- Avalon - at Habitus Gallery. Five short-films (four fiction and one documentary). Supported by Cervantes Institute in collaboration with the External Affairs Ministry and the International Cooperation of Spain.
- Romanian short powered by Timishort - at Habitus Gallery. The short movies selection presented at ARTmania is made up of movies that participated at the 2013 edition of Timishort National Competition.
- (Czech Republic) FAMU Shorts powered by the Czech Cultural Centre - at Habitus Gallery. FAMU - Film and TV School of the Academy of Performing Arts in Prague.
- (Austria) Austrian Shorts - at Habitus Gallery. The Austrian Shorts Series consists of a selection of 15 Austrian short-films, all nominated at the "Best Short-Film" section in 2012.

=== 2012 ===
- Preview ”Luna Plina” Festival at Habitus Gallery. Powered by The Association for the Promotion of Romanian Films and Transilvania International Film Festival.
- (Czech Republic) - Year of the Devil at Habitus Gallery. Powered by the Czech Centre.
- (Poland) - Beats of Freedom at Habitus Gallery. Powered by the Polish Institute.
- Romanian Animation, powered by Anim`est at Habitus Gallery.
- Best of Anim`est 2011, powered by Anim`est at Habitus Gallery.
- (United Kingdom) - FutureShorts - Summer Season at Habitus Gallery.
- (European Union) - ”Hubble - 15 years of discoveries” at Habitus Gallery.
- (European Union) - ”Eyes on The Skies” at Habitus Gallery. Powered by ESO.

=== 2011 ===
- (United Kingdom) Punksters & Youngsters (FI) 2008 – an ASTRA film projection in the Small Square

== Museum exhibitions ==
All events Romanian, unless otherwise stated.

=== 2013 ===
- The ASTRA National Museum Complex, together with the Romanian Peasant Museum in Bucharest, with the support of the Turkish Democratic Union in Romania, brings to the attention of the public the Ada Kaleh island - the island of dream and oblivion - at Casa Hermes, Small Square.
- "To found, to build...to become" - at Casa Artelor, Small Square. Traditional tools, vintage photographs.
- "The fair of the traditional creators of Romania" - ASTRA National Museum Complex.
- "The national festival of traditions" - ASTRA National Museum Complex.
- "Gothic" - Brukenthal National Museum, Large Square. Is the first to explore the roots of the phenomenon in the visual arts at the end of the 18th century and throughout the 19th century, highlighting the literary sources and the historical context of the neo-gothic reaction to the Enlightenment.
- "Poeme pentru pasari si extraterestrii" - by Cristian Badilita. At Contemporary Art Gallery.

=== 2010 ===
- Romanian Traditional Craftsmen Fair – Museum of Traditional Folk Civilization (ASTRA National Museum Complex)
- (Norway) “Contemporary Norwegian arts and crafts” exhibition – architecture and design exhibition hosted in House of Arts from the Small Square of Sibiu
- Traditional art exhibitions – Museum of Transylvanian Civilization
- Exhibitions – “Emil Sigerus” Museum of German Ethnography and Folk Art
- European Art Gallery & the Brukenthal Library permanent exhibitions – hosted by Brukenthal Pallace
- Romanian Art Gallery & the Restoration studios permanent exhibition- hosted by the Blue House, in the Large Square
- Contemporary Art Gallery permanent exhibitions - within Brukenthal Museum
- “Altemberger House” Museum of History permanent exhibitions - within Brukenthal Museum
- Museum of Natural History permanent exhibitions
- Museum of History of Pharmacy permanent exhibitions – in the Small Square
- ASTRA Museum complex’s permanent exhibitions

== Workshops & other cultural manifestations ==
All events Romanian, unless otherwise stated.

=== 2014 ===
- Carturesti Pop-Up Store
- Lounge area where the crowd saw movies, red books or played board games, learned tattoo ‘do it yourself style’ and got horror movie style make-ups, played with Happy Color and went shopping for music, clothes and accessories, all specially selected for core fans of the festival.

=== 2013 ===
- Bruno Wine Bar - comes to ARTmania to complete the depth of a prose or poetry lecture with a noble wine or a refreshing appetizer for the summer. Bruno Wine Bar introduces in the urban landscape a mix of refinement and tradition with modernity.
- Editura Vellant - Small Square. Vellant brings a selection of the best books of the year. One of the best publishing houses in Romania, Vellant has published refined books for children, big and small, contemporary novels, art and architecture albums and essay collections that make us see the world in a different way.
- Harley Davidson Parade in the Large Square.

=== 2012 ===
- Katy Babanu -live multimedia workshop in the Small Square (Baroque Garden).
- Noni - live painting, Small Square (Baroque Garden).
- Astronomy workshop ”Hide and Seek in the Solar System” in the Small Square.
- Astronomical Observations in the Small Square.
- Astronomy workshop ”Galaxies - Distant Islands of the Stars” in the Small Square.
- Nego live drawing ”Life is an open door” in the Small Square.
- Astronomy workshop ” The Telescope ” in the Small Square.

=== 2011 ===
- Miluta Flueras - workshop dedicated to concert photography at the Artists’ Café, ArtCafe.

=== 2010 ===
- (Finland) Kai Hahto (Swallow The Sun) Drum Workshop – workshop powered by Guitar Shop in the Small Square

=== 2009 ===
- “The Art of Fire” - street fire show by Crispus in the Large Square and the Small Square

== Warm-up parties & After parties ==
All events Romanian, unless otherwise stated.

=== 2013 ===
- Opening Party in Bohemian Flow
- "Obsession" performing in Bohemian Flow
- Disaster Party - in Oldies Pub
- Dark Fusion live & Afterparty in Bohemian Flow
- Vespera live & Afterparty in Bohemian Flow
- Closing Party with DJ Hefe in the Small Square

=== 2012 ===
- Welcoming Party with Transylvania Rock Society in Oldies Live Music Pub
- Deathstars Afterparty with Lux Noctis in Oldies Live Music Pub
- Die Toten Hosen Afterparty in Vintage Pub
- ARTmania Warm-up Party with Heavy Hour in Oldies Live Music Pub. Special guest: Kitsune Art(Spain)
- Edguy Afterparty in Vintage Pub
- ARTmania 2012 Closing Party at Oldies Live Music Pub

=== 2010 ===
- SOM Afterparty – by Ian P. Chris (DE) & Ina Lux Noctis at Flying Time club
- Silviu D. Heavy Hour - DJ Set at Bohemian Flow club
- Ina Lux Noctis Afterparty - DJ set at Kultur Cafe Sigi
- Silviu D. Acid Phonique - Flying Time club

=== 2009 ===
- Silent Noise, Onishka & Ina DJ Set held in Bohemian Flow
- Ewvoll & Nedeea DJ set held in Sigi Kultur Café

=== 2008 ===
- (United Kingdom) Anathema Warm-Up Party – held in “Grigore Preoteasa” Students Cultural Center, in Bucharest
