= Electric Castle =

Annual music festival

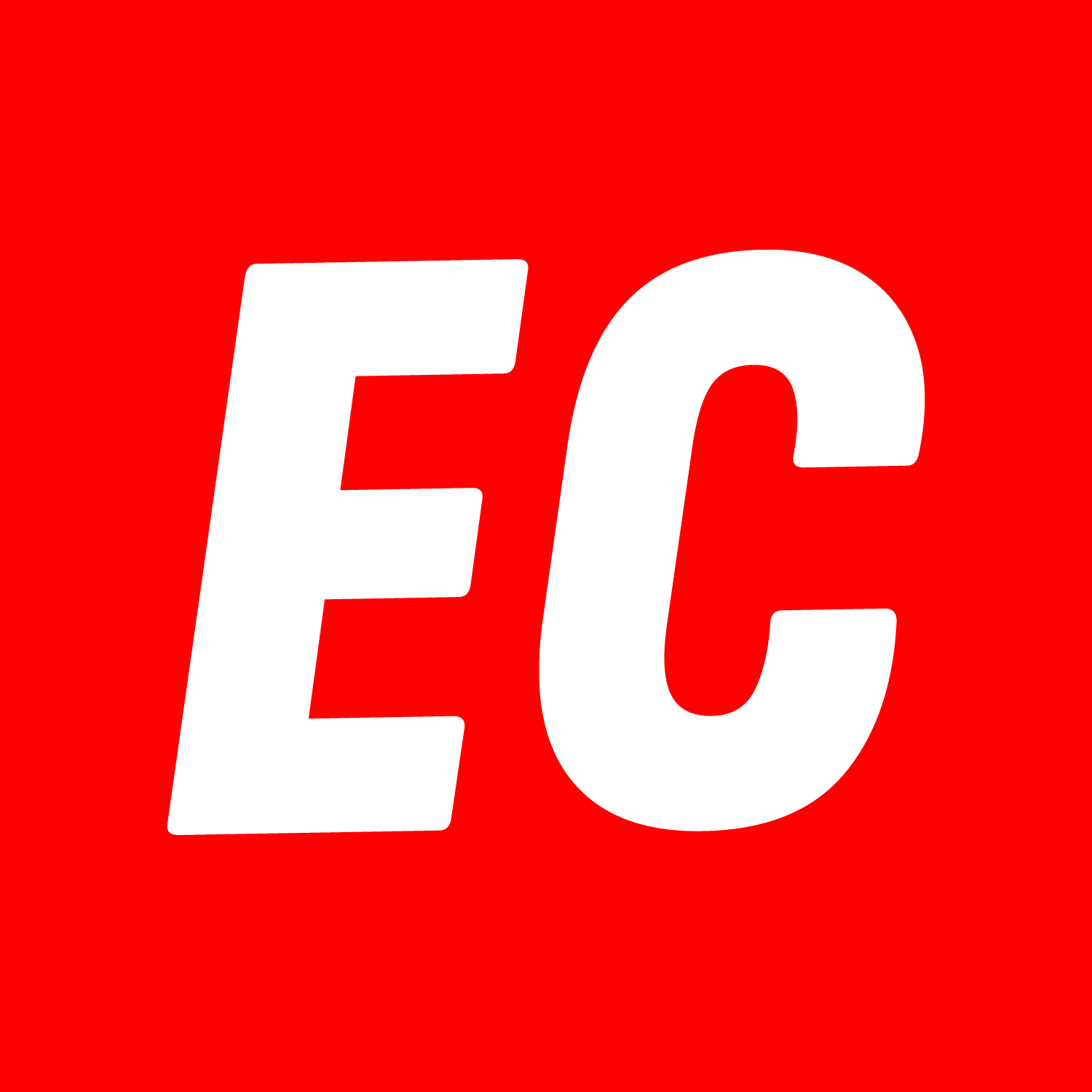
- Genre: Alternative; electronic music; rock; reggae; hip hop; indie
- Locations: Banffy Castle, Cluj, Romania
- Years active: 2013 – present
- Attendance: 274,000 during the 2024 edition
- Website: http://electriccastle.com

Electric Castle is an annual music festival held on the Transylvanian domain of the Bánffy Castle, near Cluj-Napoca in Romania, and combines music, technology and alternative arts. It features many genres of music including rock, indie, hip hop, electronic, techno, and drum and bass as well as art installations.

In 2025 Electric Castle has been awarded International Festival of the Year at the UK Festival Awards; In the seventh edition, the festival has received the award for the Best Medium Sized Festival at the European Festival Awards, where Electric Castle has been nominated since its existence. On its past editions, the festival had confirmed names such as The Cure, Twenty One Pilots, Justin Timberlake, Massive Attack, Queens of the Stone Age, Teddy Swims, Bring Me The Horizon, Gorillaz, Florence + The Machine, The Prodigy, Iggy Pop, Skrillex, Chase & Status, Justice, YUNGBLUD, Sean Paul, Shaggy, Nothing But Thieves, Bicep, Rudimental, Bonobo, Paolo Nutini, Khruangbin, Nina Kraviz, Wilkinson and many more.

== History ==
=== EC 1 - 2013 ===
The first edition of Electric Castle Festival took place from June 21 to 23. More than 32.000 people attended and over 90 artists performed on the 4 stages.

Lineup:

Morcheeba, Pendulum DJ Set, Feed Me, James Zabiela, Fritz Kalkbrenner, Dub Pistols, Stanton Warriors, A Skillz, Krafty Kuts, Wankelmut, Telepopmusik and many others.

=== EC 2 - 2014 ===
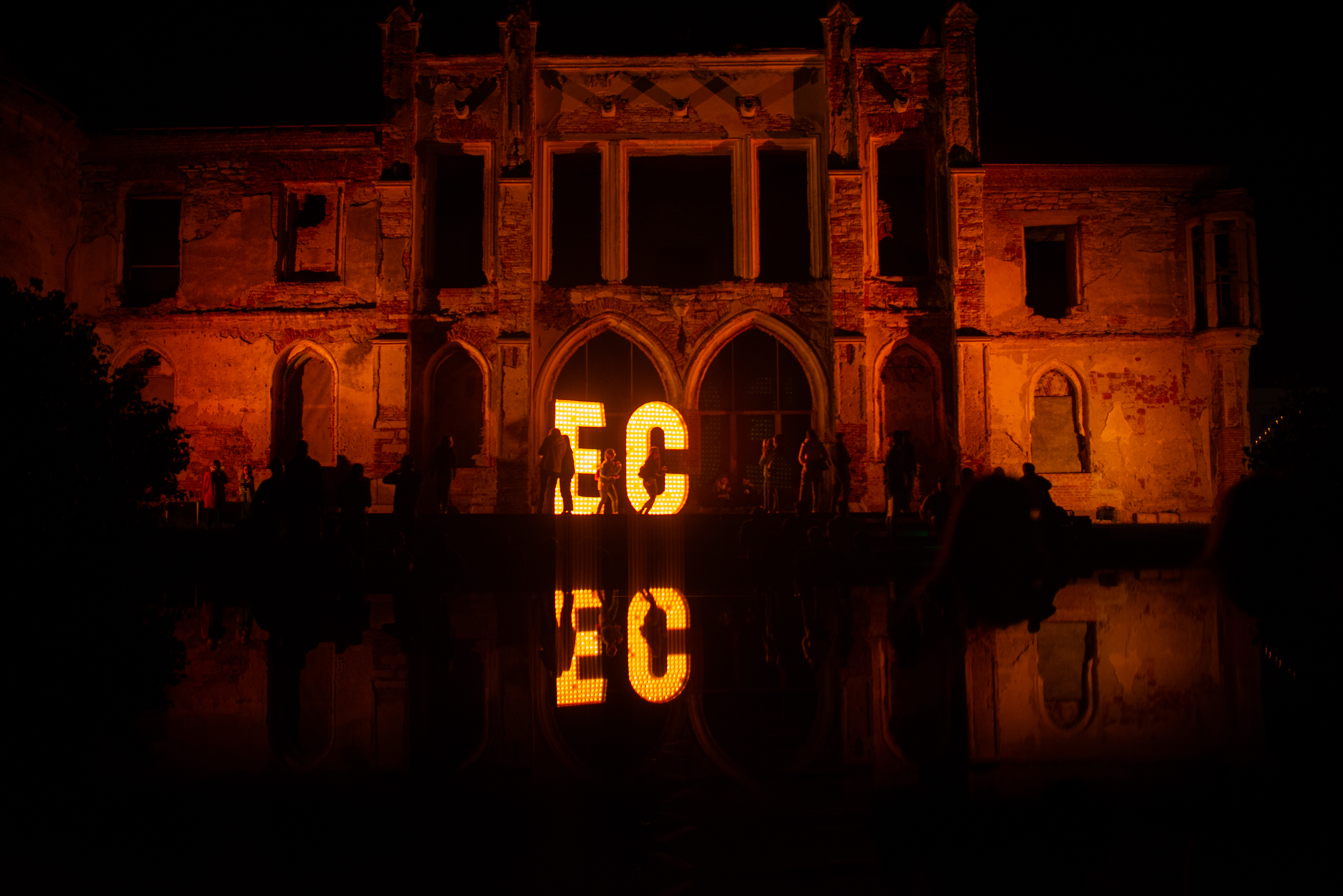
EC Sign near the Banffy Castle.

The second edition of the Electric Castle Festival took place from June 19 to 22. It had an audience of 79,000 (11,000 only in the camping area), becoming the second biggest Romanian music event ever. The 2014 edition went under the slogan of "bigger, stronger, better", with 4 festival days, 5 stages and over 130 artists.

One of the first headliners of the festival, Rusko, was announced in December 2013. Rusko was about to perform for the first time in Romania. The list continued with artists like Thievery Corporation, DJ Fresh and Bonobo. Due to medical reasons Rusko had to cancel the concert being replaced by Dub FX.

Die Antwoord were announced as the headliner in March 2014, Gramatik and Sasha being the last names announced to perform this year.

Die Antwoord have included Romania in their world tour for the first time as well. Their concert represented the release of their new album called Donker Mag.

The number of the artists invited was 130, the number of stages on which the artists performed was 5.

Lineup:

Die Antwoord, Thievery Corporation, Bonobo, Dub FX, DJ Fresh, Gramatik, Chris Liebing, Kraak and Smaak, Wilkinson, Foreign Beggars, Delta Heavy, Oliver Koletzki, Dub Pistols, Akua Naru, DJ EZ, Suie Paparude, Fred V & Grafix and many others.

=== EC 3 - 2015 ===
The third edition of Electric Castle took place from June 25 to 28. It had an audience of 97.000 people, 6 musical stages and over 150 performing artists. The festival spread on 10.000 square meters surface.

Lineup:

The Prodigy, Rudimental, Fatboy Slim, The Parov Stelar Band, The Cat Empire, The Glitch Mob, Maya Jane Coles, Sub Focus, Sigma. Netsky Live, The Subways, Nouvelle Vague, Roni Size Reprazent and many others.

=== EC 4 - 2016 ===
The fourth edition of Electric Castle took place from July 14 to 17. With a new festival setup, spread on 18.000 square meters surface, the festival brought over 120.000 people in 4 Days.

Lineup:

Skrillex, Bring Me the Horizon, Sigur Rós, Bastille, Paul Kalkbrenner, Gorgon City, Enter Shikari, Rusko, Flux Pavilion, Dilated Peoples, Camo & Krooked, Pan-Pot and many others.

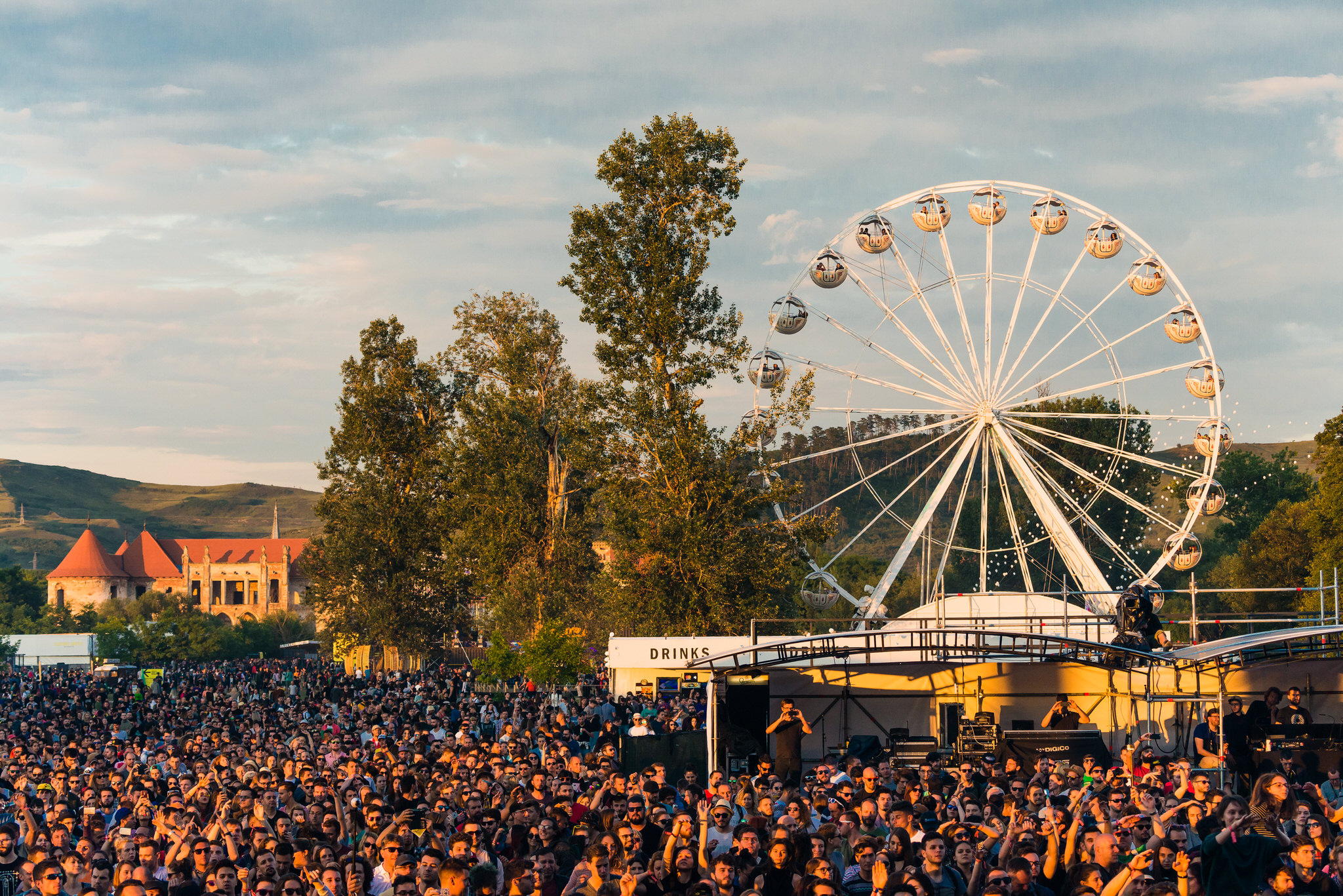
Electric Castle 2017 - Crowd and Castle view

=== EC 5 - 2017 ===
The fifth edition of Electric Castle took place between the 12th and 16 July 2017. Held under the motto "The most spectacular EC yet", it was the biggest edition of Electric Castle yet with over 171.000 visiting the festival during the 5 days.

Lineup:

Deadmau5, Franz Ferdinand, Zedd, Alt-J, Paul van Dyk, Moderat, Nero, Duke Dumont, Noisia, Trentemøller, House of Pain and many others.

=== EC 6 - 2018 ===
The sixth edition of Electric Castle (EC6) took place between July 18–22. Held under the "Meet me at the Castle" motto, EC6 continued the festival's expansion with a 30% increase on the festival grounds and covered structures for more than 25.000 people.

Lineup:

Damian Marley, Jessie J, Mura Masa, Richie Hawtin, Groove Armada, San Holo, Wolf Alice, Subcarpați, Little Big, Kensington (band), Alison Wonderland, Little Boots and many others.

2018 saw the first Elrow party in Romania and the first stage takeover for a festival in Romania with the Hospitality - Hospital Records - drum and bass night at a secondary stage.

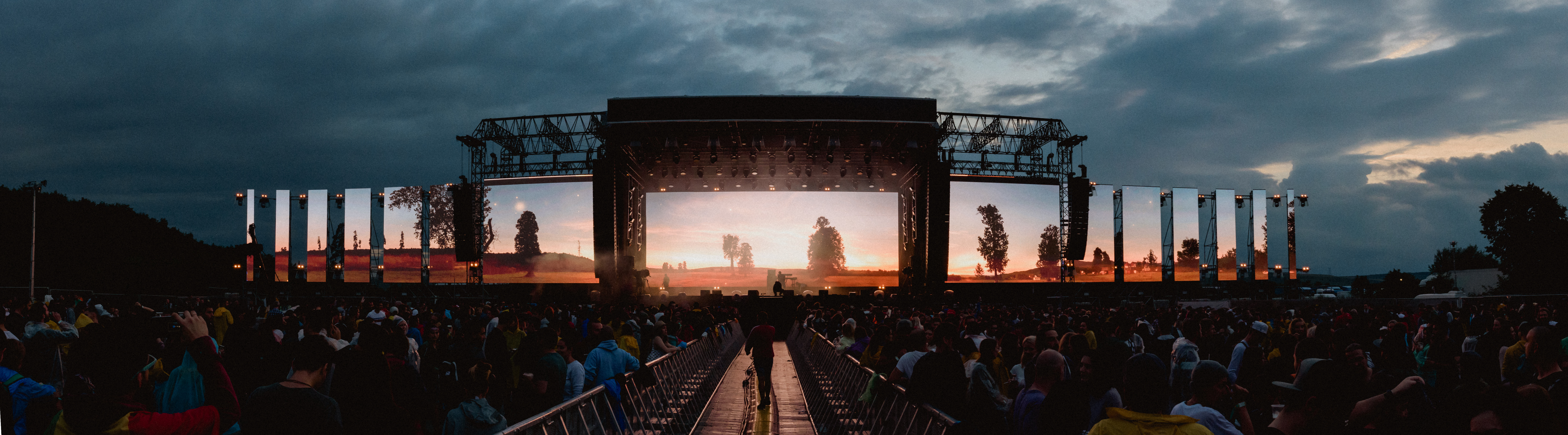

=== EC 7 - 2019 ===
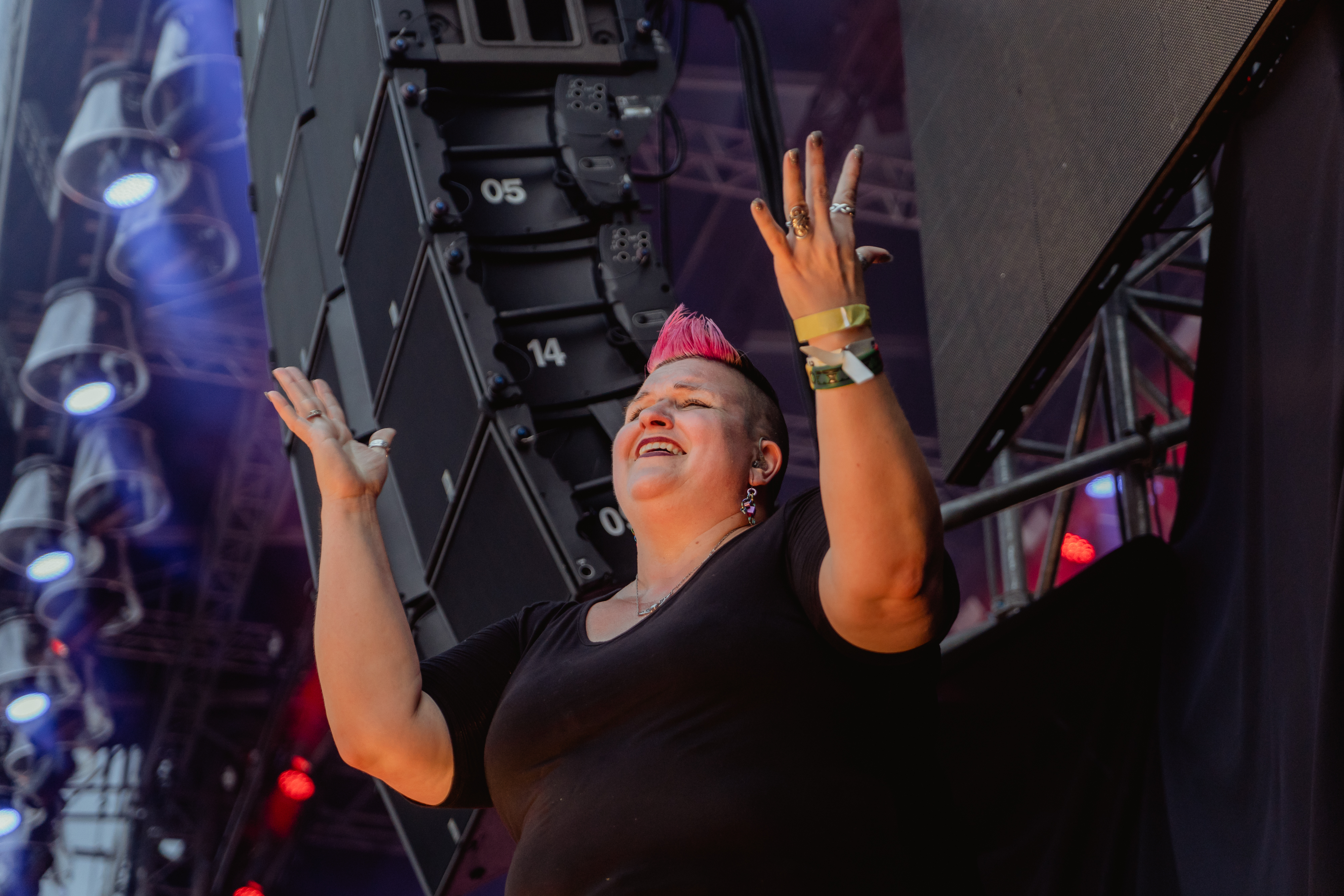
Amber Galloway Gallego interpreting the main acts of Electric Castle 2019 in ASL.

The seventh edition of Electric Castle (EC7) took place between July 17–21. Held under the "All Things Hidden/All Things Beautiful" motto, EC7 highlighted the contrasts a festival goer sees during the daytime vs during nighttime. This year was also the first time New Media Castle, a showcase of art installations by visual artists, took place inside the castle and the adjacent buildings.

Lineup:

Florence + The Machine, Thirty Seconds to Mars, Limp Bizkit, Bring Me the Horizon, CHVRCHES, Sofi Tukker, Metric, The Vaccines, Zeds Dead, Zomboy, Jauz, Sigma, Infected Mushroom, The Black Madonna, TOKiMONSTA, Polo&Pan and many others.

Accessibility for the hearing impaired

Electric Castle 2019 was the first Romanian festival to implement a sign language translator for the hearing impaired with the help of Amber Galloway Gallego and her team. The sign language interpreters were positioned on a raised platform on the right of the Main Stage and translated all major acts.

=== EC 8 - 2021* ===
The eighth edition of Electric Castle (EC8) should have taken place between July 14–18, 2021.

Expected 2021 Lineup:

Twenty One Pilots, The Chemical Brothers, Placebo, Foals, Aurora, The Neighbourhood, Machine Gun Kelly, Sheck Wes, Fisher, Zhu, Bicep, Rezz, Amon Tobin and many others.

=== EC_Special - 2021 ===
As the pandemic led to constantly changing sanitary regulations, the organizers chose to postpone EC 8 for 2022 and came up with a new concept, adapted for those uncertain times.

EC_Special took place between August 6-15 2021. The 10-day festival took place across 30 venues in Cluj-Napoca and Bonțida.

Lineup:

More than 300 music and new media acts. The most awaited artists were Asaf Avidan, Aurora, Sigma, Slowthai, HVOB and Ben Böhmer.

=== EC 8 - 2022 ===
The next edition of Electric Castle (EC8) took place between 13-17 July, 2022 and brought more than 272,000 participants during the whole festival period. Over 5 days, participants who chose to camp right next to the festival, became the residents of a mini-society called EC Village. The sold out campsite welcomed 15,000 people and the dedicated stage from this area was one of the 10 music stages at the festival.

Hundreds of artists performed on the other stages, among which the most anticipated were: Twenty One Pilots, Gorillaz, Disclosure, Moderat, Caribou, Editors, Mogwai, Yves Tumor, WhoMadeWho, Apashe, Lola Marsh or Balming Tiger.

=== EC 9 - 2023 ===
The ninth edition of Electric Castle (EC9) unfolded between July 19-23, 2023, with over 350 artists performing and around 232.000 attendees.

Headlined by the likes of George Ezra, marking his Romanian debut, and punk legend Iggy Pop, the festival saw exhilarating performances that catered to varied musical tastes. Noteworthy comebacks included the ethereal Icelandic band, Sigur Ros, rock ensemble, Nothing But Thieves, and drum and bass titans, Pendulum, who graced Bonțida with a live act after a decade-long hiatus.

Major acts that completed the EC9 lineup were: Macklemore, Jamie xx, Tash Sultana, Morcheeba, Frank Carter and the Rattlesnakes, Orbital (band) and Noga Erez.

The festival also hosted a special night in honor of Hospital Records' 25th anniversary, with performances from Netsky, Metrik, Flava D and London Elektricity.

=== EC 10 - 2024 ===
The tenth edition of Electric Castle took place between July 17-21, 2024, with 12 stages and over 250 artists and an attendance of 274,000 people.

Headlined by Massive Attack and Bring Me The Horizon, and noteworthy appearances included Rema, Sean Paul and Chase and Status (LIVE). The festival also featured Ricardo Villalobos, Paolo Nutini, and Khruangbin.

=== EC 11 - 2025 ===
Electric Castle 2025 marked the eleventh edition of the festival at Bánffy Castle in Bonțida, Romania, held from July 16 to 20. The event drew an attendance of over 200,000 people. This year’s lineup included Justin Timberlake, Queens of the Stone Age, and Justice, alongside Yungblud, Bicep, and Shaggy.

=== EC 12 - 2026 ===
Electric Castle 2026 is the 12th edition of the festival held at Bánffy Castle in Bonțida, Romania, set for 16-19 July 2026.

Major acts that were on the EC12 line-up were: The Cure, Twenty One Pilots, Teddy Swims, Chase & Status, Nothing But Thieves, LP, Kneecap, Mochakk, Yung Lean & Bladee, Dogstar, Archive, Sleaford Mods, Skream & Benga, Wilkinson, and many more.

== The Castle ==
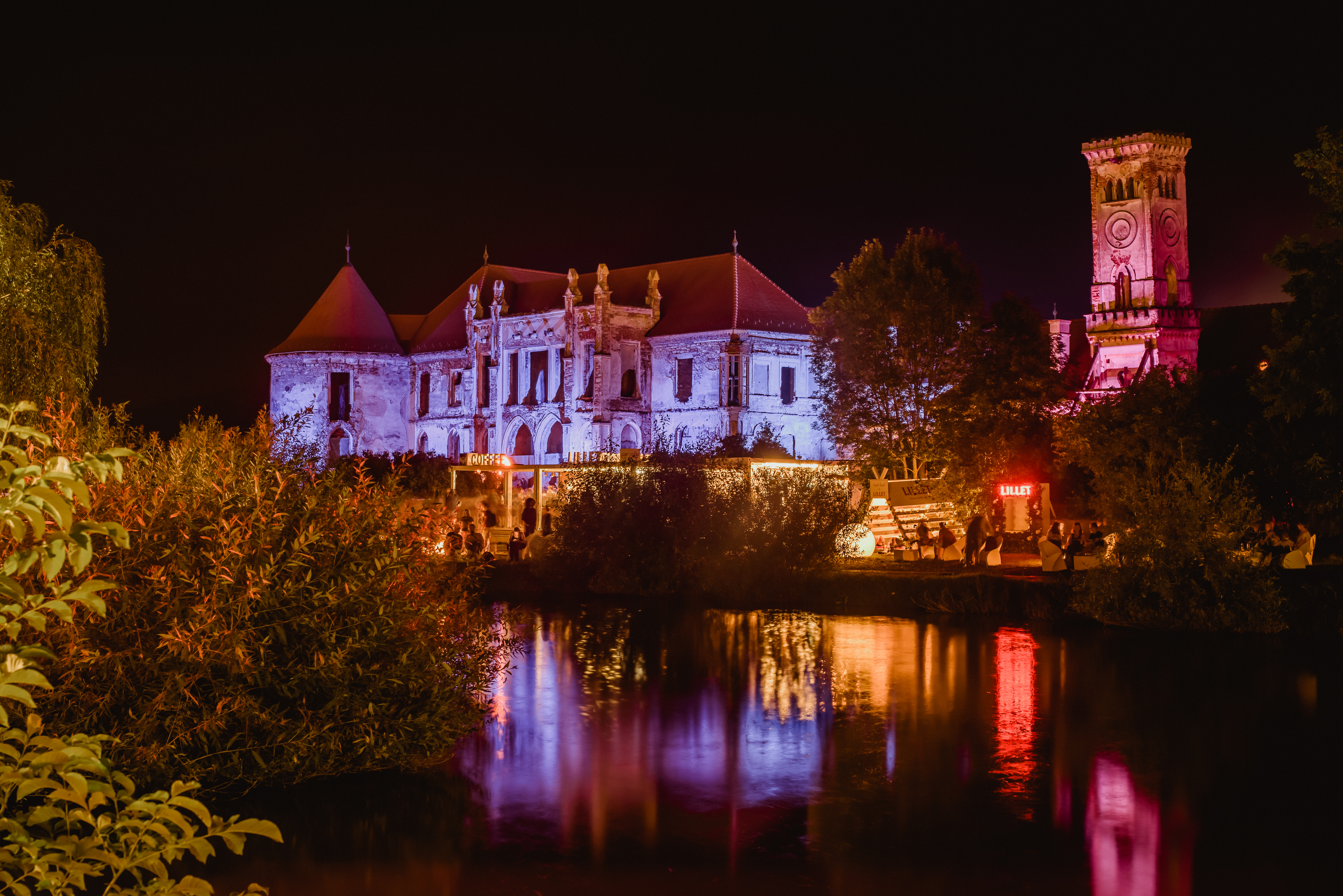
Banffy Castle during Electric Castle

Bánffy Castle (or Bonţida Bánffy Castle) is an architectonic Baroque monument situated in Bonţidaa village in the vicinity of Cluj-Napoca, Romania. It was built during the 15th century and was owned by the Bánffy family (of which Miklós Bánffy was a member). The owner is Katalin Banffy.

The castle was desecrated during World War II by German troops and neglected by the communist regime in Romania; it is currently being restored by the Transylvania Trust as a cultural center. Through the presence of the Transylvania Trust and the Institute of Historic Building Conservation, who are the organizers of the International Built Heritage Conservation Training Centre set up within the Castle, the high quality restoration and long term protection can be ensured.

Electric Castle Festival is supporting the restoration process by donating an amount of the money earned from the tickets sale.

== Impact ==
The festival generates revenue for the Bonțida community as a large number of locals convert their homes into hostels to provide accommodation for the festival goers. Also, some locals provide parking spaces for the participants' cars and cheap alternatives for food and drinks.

The organisers have raised money for the Bánffy Castle's restoration, and managed to restore the roof and build flooring, through the ongoing Give me a Brick campaign, encouraging festival goers to donate "bricks" or "mortar" through the festival bars. The "bricks" and "mortar" are sums of money equivalent to an actual brick and an actual bucket of mortar.

Through the continued implication of festival sponsors, the sports ground for the local school was restored and furniture was bought for classrooms.

== Awards ==
2013 - After the first edition in 2013, the festival was nominated by European Festivals Awards for the Best New Festival and Best Medium Size Festival titles, later on being shortlisted at the Best Medium Size Festival among festivals such as Melt!, Balaton Sound, I Love Techno or Volt.

2014 - The festival was again shortlisted among the best European festivals by European Festivals Awards

2015 - Electric Castle was shortlisted for the third time for the Best Medium Sized Festival by European Festivals Awards

2017 - Electric Castle was shortlisted for the fourth time for the Best Medium Sized Festival by European Festivals Awards

2017 - Electric Castle has received the award for Best Camping Award, by European Festivals Awards

2018 - Electric Castle was shortlisted for the fifth time for the Best Medium Sized Festival by European Festivals Awards

2018 - Electric Castle has received the award for Best Food & Drinks Award, by European Festivals Awards

2019 - Electric Castle was shortlisted for Green Operations, by European Festivals Awards

2019 - Electric Castle received the award for Best Medium Sized Festival by European Festivals Awards

2025 - Electric Castle received the award for International Festival of the Year by UK Festival Awards.

== See also ==
- List of electronic music festivals
