= Bonțida =

- Commune
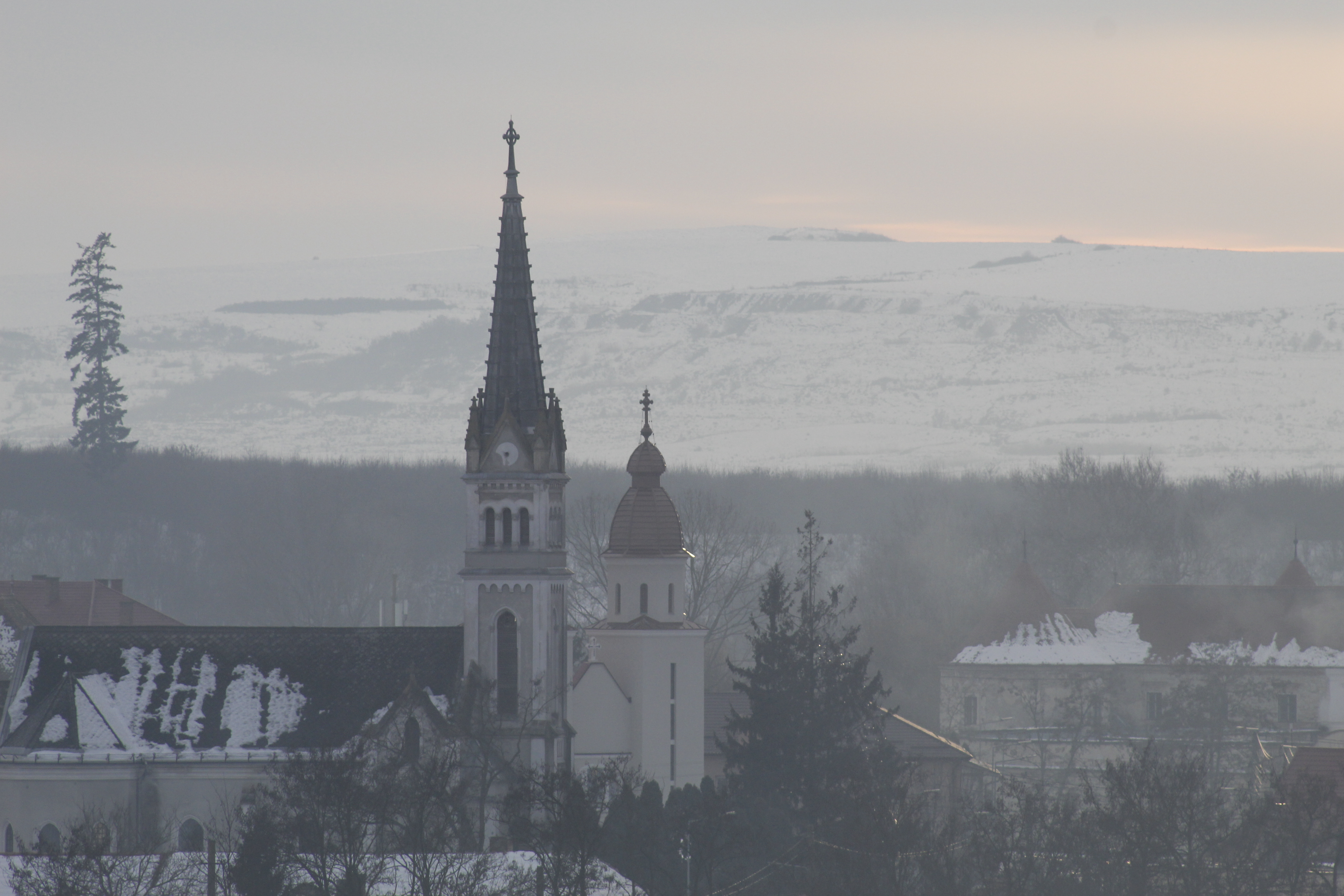

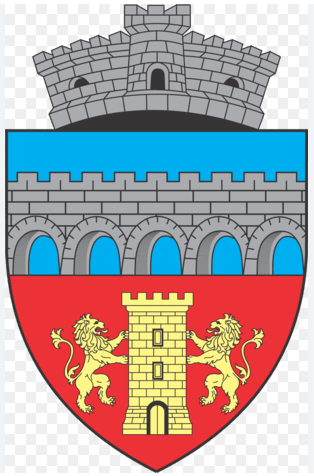
- Coat of arms

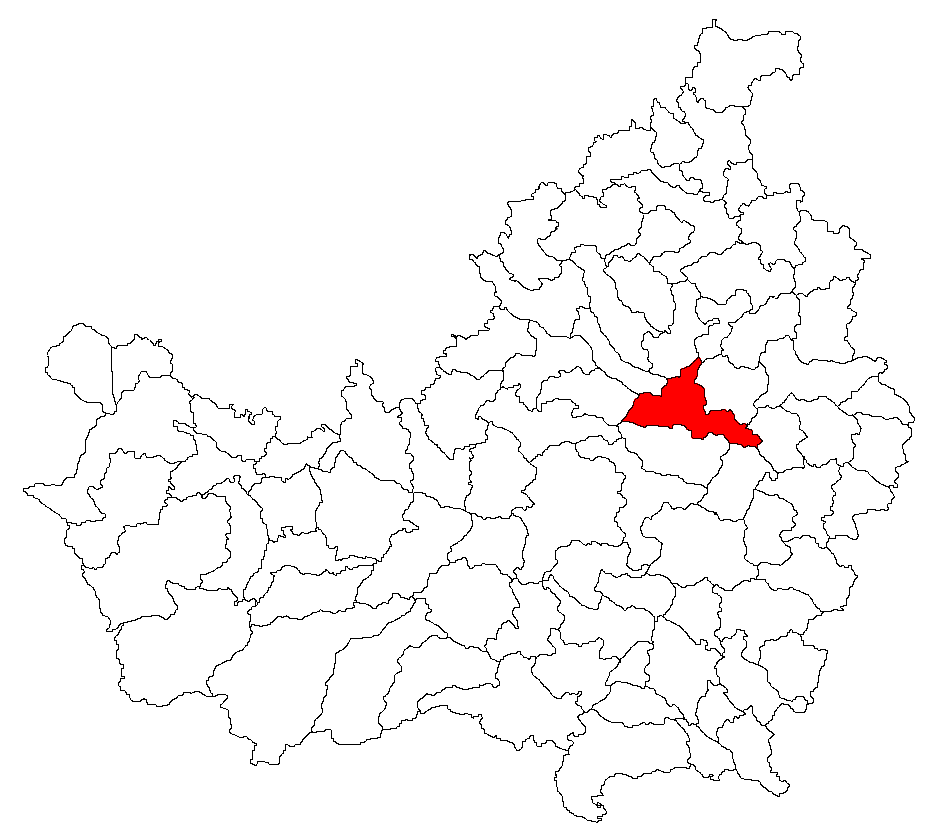
- Location in Cluj County

- Location in Romania
- Coordinates: 46°54′N 23°48′E
- Country: Romania
- County: Cluj
- Established: 1263
- Subdivisions: Bonțida, Coasta, Răscruci, Tăușeni

Government
  - Mayor (2020–2024): Emil Cărhaț (PNL)
- Area: 80.38 km^{2} (31.03 sq mi)
- Elevation: 296 m (971 ft)
- Population (2021-12-01): 5,191
  - Density: 64.58/km^{2} (167.3/sq mi)
- Time zone: UTC+02:00 (EET)
  - Summer (DST): UTC+03:00 (EEST)
- Postal code: 407105
- Area code: +40 x64
- Vehicle reg.: CJ
- Website: comunabontida.ro

Bonțida (Romanian pronunciation: [bonˈt͡sida]; Hungarian: Bonchida, pronounced [ˈbont͡shidɒ], transl. "Bonc's bridge"; German: Bonisbruck) is a commune in Cluj County, Transylvania, Romania. It is composed of four villages: Bonțida, Coasta (Gyulatelke), Răscruci (Válaszút), and Tăușeni (Marokháza).

== Geography ==
The commune lies in the Transylvanian Plain, on the banks of the rivers Someșul Mic, Borșa, and Sicu. It is located in north-central Cluj County, 26 km (16 mi) northeast of the county seat, Cluj-Napoca, and part of the Cluj-Napoca metropolitan area. Bonțida is crossed by the national road DN1C, which connects Cluj-Napoca to Baia Mare and the Romania–Ukraine border at Halmeu.

== History ==
Bonțida is known as the home of a Baroque castle owned by the Bánffy family (of which Miklós Bánffy was a member); partly destroyed during World War II and neglected by the communist regime in Romania, it is currently being restored.

The Bánffy family had another castle in Răscruci, which is part of Bonțida and also the birthplace of poet Albert Wass. The Răscruci castle features in the reminiscences of an English governess, Florence Tarring, who worked for one of the branches of the Bánffy family during World War I (1914–1919).

== Demographics ==
Historical population
Year	Pop.	±%
1850	3,643	—
1880	3,503	−3.8%
1890	4,203	+20.0%
1900	4,616	+9.8%
1910	4,809	+4.2%
1920	4,737	−1.5%
1930	5,009	+5.7%
1941	5,092	+1.7%
1956	5,658	+11.1%
1966	5,299	−6.3%
1977	5,543	+4.6%
1992	4,447	−19.8%
2002	4,722	+6.2%
2011	4,690	−0.7%
2021	5,191	+10.7%
Source: Census data

According to the census from 2002 there was a total population of 4,722 people living in this town; of this population, 65.07% were ethnic Romanians, 19.10% were ethnic Hungarians and 15.75% ethnic Romani. At the 2021 census, Bonțida had a population of 5,191, of which 73.8% were Romanians, 9.25% Hungarians, and 6.88% Roma.

== Natives ==
- Ștefan Emilian (1819–1899), mathematician and architect
- Dorel Vișan (born 1937), actor
- Albert Wass (1908–1998), Hungarian nobleman

== See also ==
- Bonțida Bánffy Castle
- Răscruci Bánffy Castle
- Electric Castle
