= Bitter Moon (disambiguation) =

Bitter Moon is a 1992 Franco-British-American romantic thriller film directed by Roman Polanski.

Bitter Moon may also refer to:

- "Bitter Moon", a single by bassist Mark King of Level 42
- Luna Amară (a.k.a. Bitter Moon), a Romanian alternative rock/grunge band
