= Lapper =

Lapper is a surname. Notable people with the surname include:

- Alison Lapper (born 1965), English artist
- Mike Lapper (born 1970), American soccer player

== See also ==
- Lappe
