= The Transylvanian Trilogy =

Novel in three parts by Miklós Bánffy

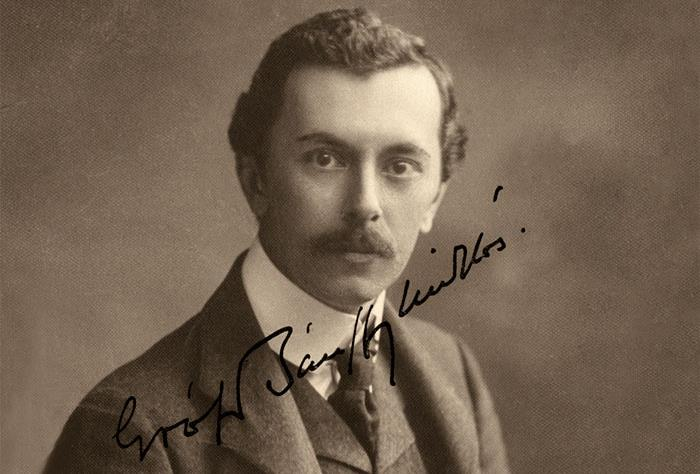
Miklós Bánffy

The Transylvanian Trilogy, also called A Transylvanian Tale (Hungarian: Erdélyi történet) or The Writing on the Wall, is a novel in three parts by the Hungarian writer Miklós Bánffy, published from 1934 to 1940. The trilogy tells about the moral decline of the Hungarian nobility and the loss of (Austria-)Hungary as a nation, in the ten years preceding the outbreak of the First World War. The novel tells the story of two cousins, the socially engaged count Bálint Abády and count László Gyerőffy. Their lives are set against the background of the political events in and outside Hungary. A part of the storyline takes place on the Transylvanian Plain, the area where Bánffy himself grew up.

The trilogy appeared just before the Second World War, after which a communist regime came to power in Hungary. This regime initially gave no room for publishing a novel in which the life of the aristocracy stood so central. Only in the 1980s was the book published again in Hungary. The first English translation was published in 1999.

== Volumes ==
=== First part ===
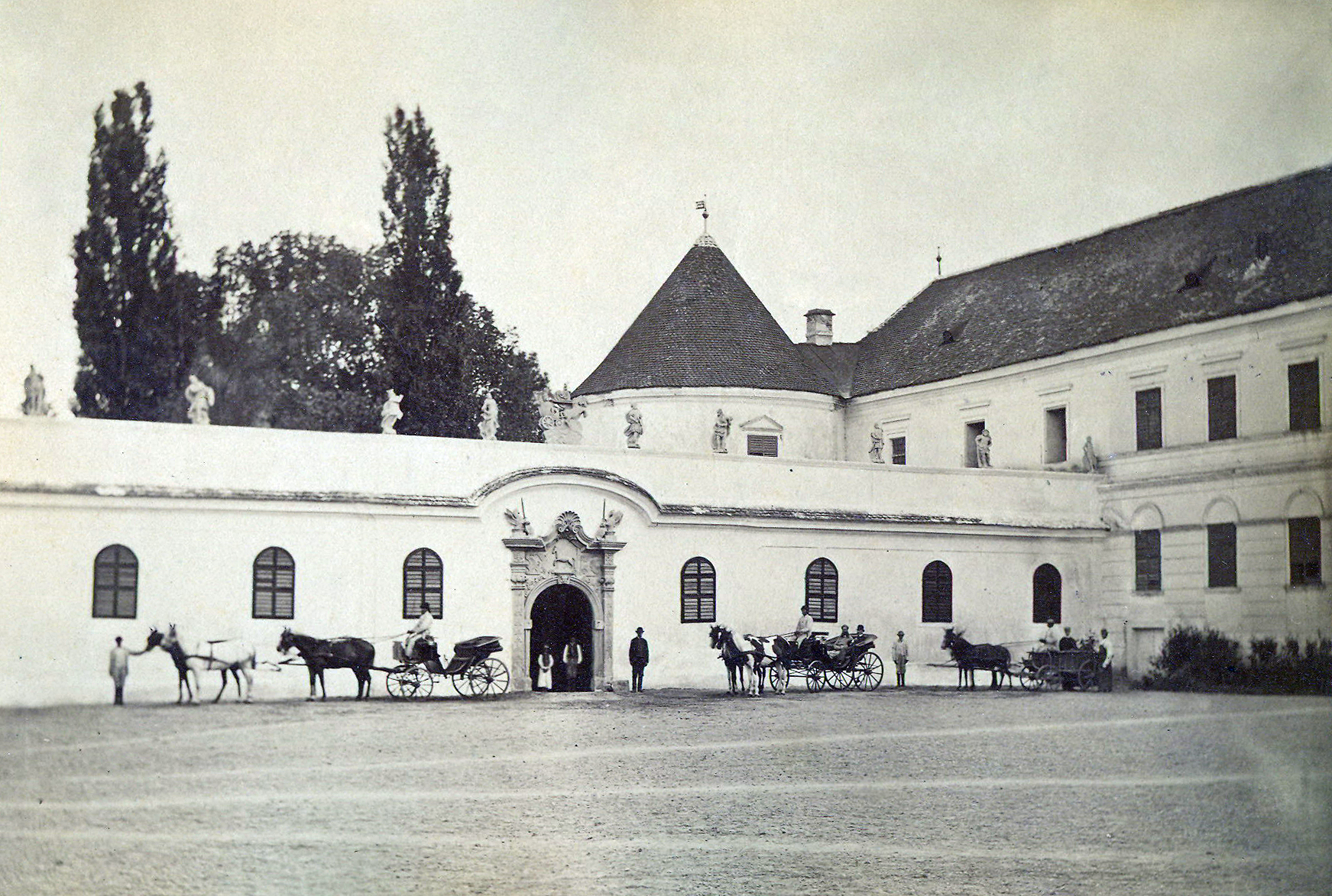
Bánffy Castle, on which the fictional castle Dénestornya in The Transylvanian Trilogy was inspired

The first part of the trilogy is called "Megszámláltattál" ("You are counted") in Hungarian and was finished in 1934. The title is a reference to Daniel 5, 26. In the Biblical Book of Daniel the words "Counted, counted, weighed, divided", which are written on a wall, are interpreted by Daniel to the Babylonian crown prince in the sense that the days of the king are counted, the king weighed but found wanting and his kingdom will be divided among the Medes and the Persians. This book is translated into English with the title They Were Counted.

In this book, Bálint Abády is confronted, among other things, with his impossible love for Adrienne Uzdy (for whom Bánffy's muse Carola Szilvássy stood model) and defends Romanian farmers in the mountain domains that are his family property. His cousin László gets into trouble because of his gambling addiction. The story begins in 1904 and takes place against the background of, among others, the handkerchief vote and the Hungarian crisis of 1905–1906. As a member of the House of Representatives, Bálint is closely involved in these developments. The author, Bánffy, who himself was a member of the House of Representatives, presents his view of things in this way.

=== Second part ===
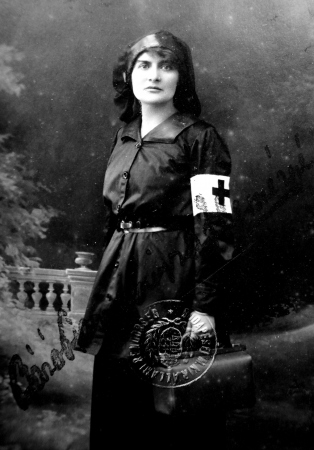
Bánffy's friend Carola Szilvássy, the inspiration for Adrienne Uzdy

The original title of the second part (1937) is "És hijjával találtattál" ('And you were found wanting'), from Daniel 5, 27. The English translation has been published under the title They Were Found Wanting. The story of the first book continues. The political background includes the arms race and the Bosnian Crisis.

=== Third part ===
The Hungarian title of the third and final volume (1940) is Darabokra szaggattatol ("You are torn to pieces"), to Daniel 5, 28. The storyline coincides with the run-up to the First World War and the Austrian mobilization against Serbia. This book appeared in English under the title They Were Divided.

== Other languages ==
The novel was originally written in Hungarian and has been translated into English, German, French, Dutch, Spanish, Italian and Romanian.
