= Lily Neill =

American harp player

Lily Neill is an American harp player. She is recognized for her performances of original music and repertoire from various folk traditions.

Neill was born in Maryland, United States and started playing the harp at the age of nine, after taking several years of piano lessons. She gave her first professional public performance the following year, earning many awards at harp competitions in the USA including the U.S. National Scottish harp competition where she was undefeated. She also earned a prize at the 1998 All-Ireland competition in Ballina, County Mayo. As a teenager she performed for then-President Bill Clinton, Congressman Richard Neal and Senators Ted Kennedy and George Mitchell as well as with The Chieftains and Derek Bell at the Kennedy Center Concert Hall in Washington DC, in his final two performances there.

Neill received a first class honours degree from the University of Limerick's Irish World Academy and released her debut CD, Without Words, while still a student. The CD earned her the 2006 New Female Artist of the Year Award from LiveIreland.com and the Irish-American News. Neill also has a Master of Music degree from the Sibelius Academy in Helsinki, Finland, and did additional studies at the Lithuanian Academy of Music and Theatre. Her second album, "The Habit of a Foreign Sky" was recorded in Helsinki.

Lily Neill is based in Europe. She recorded with Finnish rock band Carmen Gray on their debut album for Sony BMG and performs in both solo and group line-ups in Europe and the United States. She is also known for her collaboration with tap dancer Cartier Williams. She performed in Brittany at the Festival Interceltique de Lorient in both 2007 and 2008.

== Albums ==
- Without Words, 2004
- The Habit of a Foreign Sky, 2011
