= Distorted Harmony =

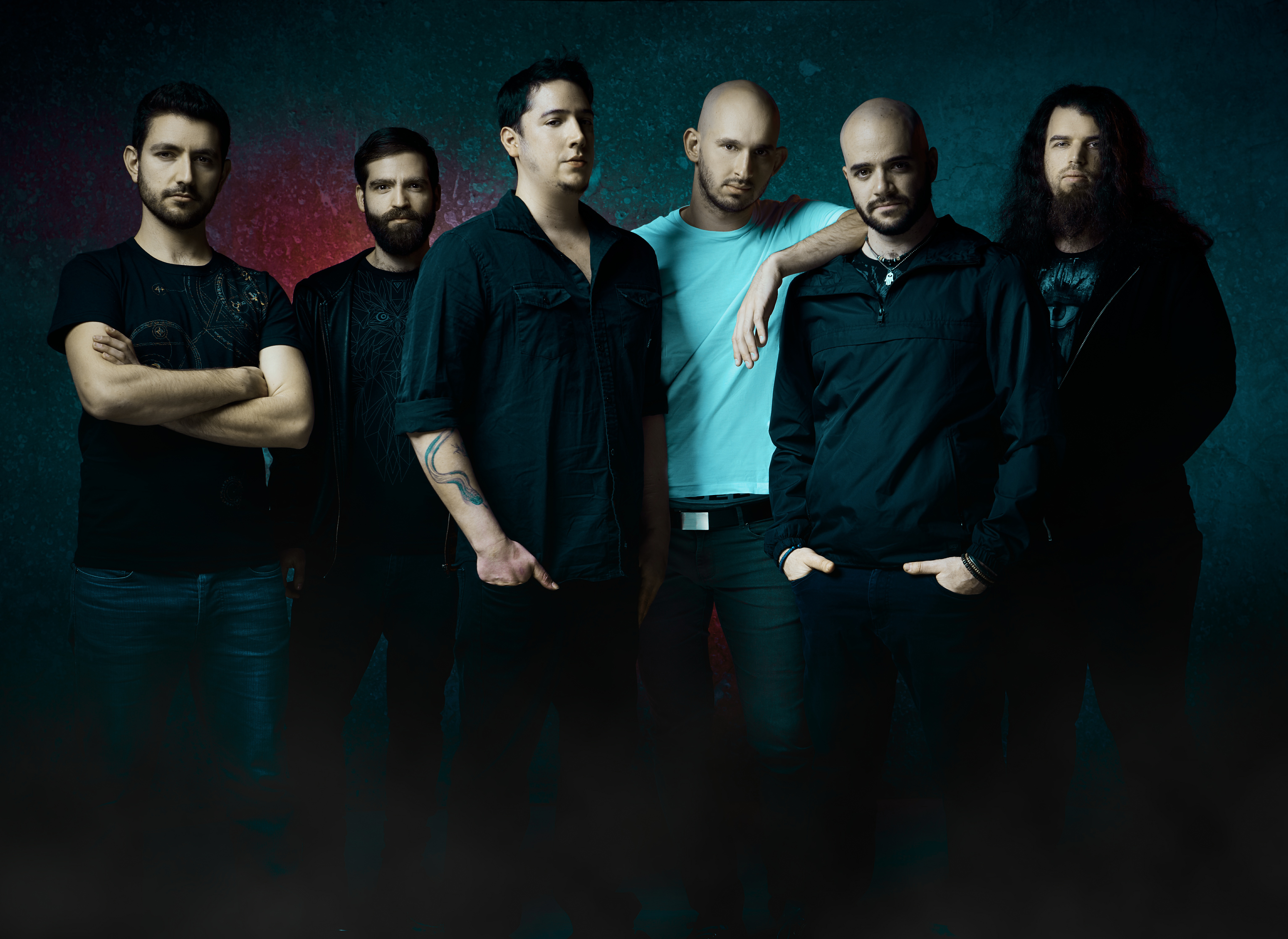
- From left to right: Yoel Genin, Iggy Cohen, Yoav Efron, Misha Soukhinin, Yogev Gabay, Amit Plaschkes

Background information
- Origin: Tel Aviv, Israel
- Genres: Progressive metal, djent, alternative rock
- Years active: 2009–present
- Members: Yoav Efron; Yogev Gabay; Michael Rose; Iggy Cohen; Amit Plaschkes; Yoel Genin
- Past members: Guy Landau
- Website: Official website

Distorted Harmony is an Israeli progressive metal band from Tel Aviv, Israel, formed in 2009.

== History ==
=== Early years (2009–2011) ===
The band was formed in 2009, when composer and keyboardist Yoav Efron met drummer Yogev Gabay (also a member of Israeli progressive metal band Systema Teleion and Israeli progressive rock band Anakdota) and the two started working together. By 2011 they were joined by three members of Israeli alternative rock band HaTachtonim – vocalist Michael Rose (formerly named Misha Soukhinin), guitarist Guy Landau, and bassist Iggy Cohen (no longer a member of HaTachtonim).

=== Utopia (2011–2013) ===
The band's debut album "Utopia" was released on May 14, 2012, to positive feedback. Following the release of the album, the band started performing in Tel Aviv, Haifa, and Jerusalem. In October 2012, they performed at ProgStage festival in the Sea of Galilee, along with headliners The Flower Kings, Pain of Salvation, Andromeda and Orphaned Land.

In December 2012, the band released demo song "Misguided," which was later re-recorded and featured on the band's second album "Chain Reaction."

In early 2013, vocalist Michael Rose participated in the second season of reality TV singing competition The Voice Israel, reaching the quarter-finals with popular Israeli singer Sarit Hadad.

In April 2013, the band released a cover version of Muse's song "The Small Print." In July 2013, in light of its success with "Utopia," the band was nominated for the Progressive Music Award for New Blood presented by Prog Magazine, which is published by TeamRock, who also publishes the Classic Rock magazine.

In September 2013, the band played support for Neal Morse (a member of Transatlantic and Flying Colors, and a former member of Spock's Beard) and Mike Portnoy (a member of Dream Theater) in Tel Aviv.

=== Chain Reaction (2013–2015) ===
In November 2013, the band started an Indiegogo campaign with a goal of $6,000, to cover production expenses of its second album "Chain Reaction." The campaign ended successfully in January 2014, with $6,056 raised.

In July 2014, "Chain Reaction" was released both as a physical album and as a digital album. On its release day, to promote the new album, the band released the music video for "Natural Selection," a track on the album. The band also played a "Chain Reaction" launch show in August 2014 in Tel Aviv. Three months later, in November, the band held its first shows abroad, during a short tour in the Netherlands.

=== A Way Out (2015–2018) ===
In late 2015, the band revealed they are working on a third studio album.

In October 2016, the band performed at ProgPower Europe 2016. Soon after, in November 2016, the band announced a sixth member, guitarist Amit Plaschkes.

In January 2017, the band headlined its own festival, DH Fest, in Tel Aviv, which also featured other Israeli artists such as Yossi Sassi Band and Yoav's musical project ARP. At the festival, the band played a new song "Downfall" from its upcoming third studio album. It was video recorded and released online.

In July 2017, the band parted ways with guitarist Guy Landau, and announced a new member, guitarist Yoel Genin. In September 2017, the band performed at ProgPower USA 2017. The band also performed in July 2018 at ARTmania Festival 2018 in Sibiu, Romania, alongside Steven Wilson, Leprous and Haken among others.

The band's third studio album, "A Way Out", was released on July 19, 2018. "We Are Free", the first single from the album, was released in May 2018.

Yoav wrote about "A Way Out": "this time it's personal. It discusses 'me', 'us', 'with us', and how they're all blending together inside my head. Emotions, which define us, how we perceive and deal with our feelings, those we can control, but especially those we cannot - loneliness, anger, fear, desperation and even hope - they play such an important role in our lives, both as individuals and as a society. This is our strength but also our weakness - this is why we're both special and cursed at the same time. 'A Way Out' deals with those emotions of mine (mostly). It is heavy and aggressive, silent and scared, and might even be political."

== Musical style and influences ==
Distorted Harmony classifies its style as "a delicate combination of the complex progressive metal, the sound of modern alternative music, the unique harmonies of modern jazz and classical music, and some heavy shit."

The band cites its influences as American progressive metal band Dream Theater, English psychedelic progressive rock band Porcupine Tree, English alternative rock band Muse, Swedish progressive death metal band Opeth and American djent movement forerunner progressive metal band Periphery, as well as generally jazz and classical music.

== Awards and nominations ==
Year	Nominee / work	Award	Result
2013	"Utopia"	Progressive Music Award for New Blood	Nominated

== Members ==
=== Current ===
- Yoav Efron – keyboards (2009–present)
- Yogev Gabay – drums (2009–present)
- Michael Rose – vocals (2011–present)
- Iggy Cohen – bass guitar (2011–present)
- Amit Plaschkes – guitar (2016–present)
- Yoel Genin – electric guitar (2017–present)

=== Former ===
- Guy Landau – electric guitar (2011–2017)

== Discography ==
Studio albums

- Utopia (2012)
- Chain Reaction (2014)
- A Way Out (2018)
