= The Portrait of Carmen Gray =

Studio album by Carmen Gray
- Released: September 2006
- Genre: Hard rock
- Label: Sony BMG

Carmen Gray chronology
The Portrait of Carmen Gray (2006)	Welcome to Grayland (2008)

The Portrait of Carmen Gray is Carmen Gray's debut album. It was released in the middle of September 2006. The album peaked at No. 39 on the Finnish albums chart.

== Tracks ==
1. "Looking for Love" (3.20)
2. "Lost in My Mind Again" (3.57)
3. "I'm No Good Anymore" (3.05)
4. "Unbeloved (Me & Suzy)" (4.14)
5. "My Mistake" (3.36)
6. "Color Blind" (3.56)
7. "Lying with You" (3.35)
8. "Misunderstood" (5.17)
9. "A Thing About Love" (2.47)
10. "Pieces of My Broken Heart" (3.21)
11. "A Grain of Sand" (7.50)
