= Carl Filtsch =

Transylvanian composer (1830–1845)

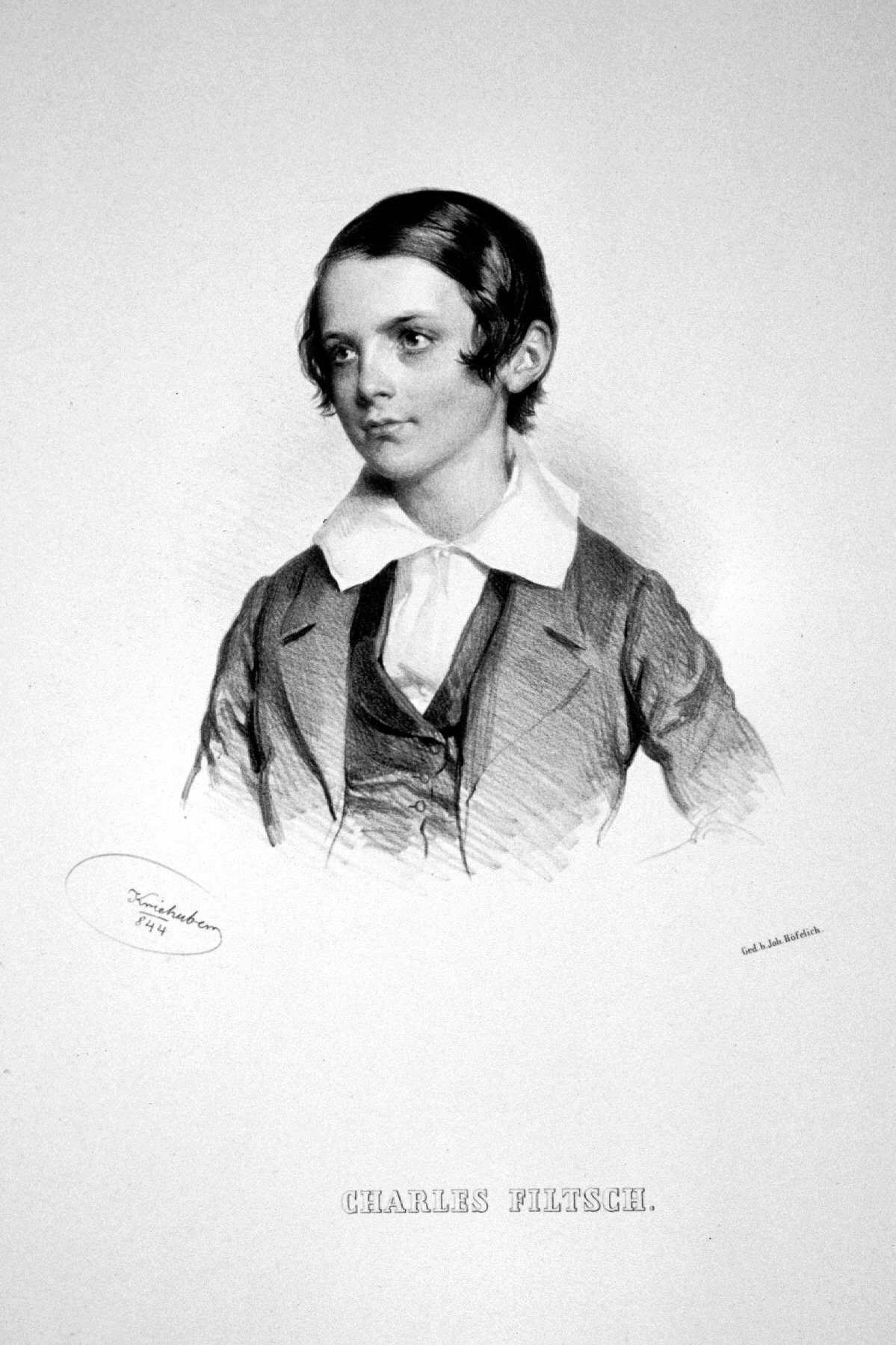

Background information
- Born: 28 May 1830; Mühlbach, Transylvania
- Died: 11 May 1845 (aged 14) Venice, Austrian Empire
- Instruments: piano

Carl Filtsch (28 May 1830 – 11 May 1845) was a Transylvanian pianist and composer. A child prodigy, he was the most favoured pupil of Frédéric Chopin.

== Life and education ==
=== Transylvania and Vienna ===
Filtsch was born in Mühlbach (today Sebeș), Transylvania, then part of the Austrian Empire, into a family of the Transylvanian Saxon community. His father Joseph Filtsch, a Lutheran pastor and poet, gave him his first piano lessons at the age of three. His elder brother Josef, himself a pianist and seventeen years his senior, played a significant part in his early training and accompanied him throughout his brief career.

In April 1837 he performed before the Diet of Transylvania at Hermannstadt; later that year he was taken to Vienna to continue his studies under the patronage of Countess Jeannette von Bánffy. His teachers there included Friedrich Wieck, August Mittag and Simon Sechter. Introduced at court, he became a playmate and musical companion of the young Franz Joseph, the future emperor.

His public debut took place on 7 February 1841 in the hall of the Gesellschaft der Musikfreunde, where the critic Moritz Gottlieb Saphir praised his maturity and his command of tone, phrasing and expression. A tour followed between June and September 1841, with stops in Budapest, Klausenburg, Kronstadt, Hermannstadt, Broos and Mühlbach.

=== Paris and Chopin ===
Carl and his brother Josef reached Paris in November 1841, carrying a letter of introduction from the pianist Friederike Müller-Streicher; a detailed letter Josef sent home on 29 November describes the journey and their first days in the city. Chopin took him on as a pupil the following month: although he almost never taught children and rarely gave a pupil more than one lesson a week, he agreed to teach Carl three times a week.

Franz Liszt, who had met him in Vienna and taught him occasionally in Chopin's absence, presented him with his own transcription of Schubert's Ständchen, inscribed to the child prodigy of Transylvania; Liszt is also credited with the remark that once the boy began touring Europe, he himself could close up shop. Chopin, after one lesson, gave him a score of Beethoven's Fidelio with an autograph dedication.

His gifts were also admired by Giacomo Meyerbeer, Ignaz Moscheles, the critic Ludwig Rellstab and his contemporary Anton Rubinstein.

=== Tours and illness ===
In April 1843 he gave his first public Paris concert in the hall of the Conservatoire. On 24 April he performed Chopin's Piano Concerto in E minor with orchestral accompaniment, the occasion on which his teacher is said to have spoken of him in terms of open admiration. From May 1843 he was in London, giving several concerts and performing at Buckingham Palace before Queen Victoria on 5 July, with a repertoire centred on Chopin and Liszt; The Musical World ranked him among the most remarkable phenomena in the history of the art. Beyond his personal success, the English visit helped to make Chopin's music, until then little known in Britain, familiar to audiences there. After Wiesbaden and Baden-Baden he returned to Vienna, where he played again before the imperial couple between late 1843 and early 1844. Around the same time the first unfavourable notices appeared in the Viennese press, criticising his Beethoven interpretations and some technical shortcomings.

=== Death and burial ===
Filtsch died in Venice on 11 May 1845, seventeen days short of his fifteenth birthday, of tuberculosis.

He was buried in the non-Catholic enclosure of the cemetery on the island of San Cristoforo, later joined by landfill to San Michele, where a marble monument was erected to him. Beneath his dates, the gravestone bears a four-line epitaph in German.

KARL FILTSCH
GEB. DEN 28. MAI 1830 ZU MÜHLBACH IN SIEBENBÜRGEN
GEST. DEN 11. MAI 1845 IN VENEDIG

DER KÜNSTLER SCHLÄFT, ES RUHN DIE THEUREN HAENDE
DIE MAECHTIG EINST BEHERRSCHT DER TÖNE MEER
DOCH IMMER WACHE TIEFE HERZENS SEHNSUCHT
NENNT SEINEN NAMEN, SEGNET IHN UND WEINT

— Inscription on the gravestone

== Quality of playing ==
According to numerous letters from Chopin and his acquaintances, Chopin considered Filtsch the most worthy interpreter of his music. A friend of Chopin, Ferdinand Denis, reported in an article in Vienna's Der Humorist in February 1843 that on one occasion after listening to Filtsch, Chopin exclaimed, "My God! What a child! Nobody has ever understood me as this child has...It is not imitation, it is the same sentiment, an instinct that makes him play without thinking as if it could not have been any other way. He plays almost all my compositions without having heard me [play them], without being shown the smallest thing – not exactly like me [because he has his own cachet], but certainly not less well."

== Rediscovery ==
Filtsch's compositions remained largely unknown until 1969, when the pianist and musicologist Peter Szaunig traced thirteen of them in private archives; the scores were published in 1994 by Gehann-Musik-Verlag of Kludenbach. In the same year Leonhard Westermayr performed them at the Gasteig in Munich, the first public performance in a hundred and fifty years, repeated the following year at the Musikverein in Vienna. In the 2000s the American musicologist Ferdinand Gajewski identified further unpublished works in London, in the archive of Sir Francis Loring, a descendant of Filtsch's brother Josef, and prepared them for publication.

Since 1995 the "Carl Filtsch" International Piano Performance and Composition Competition and Festival has been held annually in Sibiu, Romania, organised by the Sibiu State Philharmonic; the thirtieth edition took place in 2026.

His music has been recorded by Hubert Rutkowski and Chiyo Hagiwara, among others. In 2026 the Romanian pianist Ramona Munteanu released Carl Filtsch: Piano Works (Urania Records LDV14136), a collection of twenty piano pieces.

== Compositions ==
Filtsch improvised from early childhood and performed his own works in concert. The Variations Op. 2, on a theme from Bellini's Il pirata, were published in Vienna by Pietro Mechetti; Op. 3 appeared in London in 1843 from Boosey & Co. as an appendix to an edition of Chopin's works, dedicated to Countess Mária Apponyi.

The surviving catalogue is small and its extent disputed: the older literature counted eight works, while the modern editions prepared by Gajewski have made a larger number accessible. The most ambitious is the Konzertstück for piano and large orchestra in B minor, written at Baden-Baden between 1843 and 1844 and long thought lost: the manuscript was found in England in the archive of Sir Francis Loring, and the work was printed for the first time in 2005.

His surviving music stands in the line of Chopin, with clear influences of Liszt, Thalberg and Schubert, and shows a preference for dark keys and an expressive character of considerable gravity and intensity.

=== Works for piano ===
- Andante, Op. 1 No. 1
- Nocturne, Op. 1 No. 2
- Introduktion und Variationen über ein berühmtes Thema aus "Die Piraten" von V. Bellini, Op. 2, in A major
- Romanze ohne Worte, Op. 3 No. 1, in E minor
- Barcarolle, Op. 3 No. 2, in G♭ major
- Mazurka, Op. 3 No. 3, in E♭ minor
- Étude, Op. 8, in F major
- Étude, Op. 10
- Nocturne, Op. 14
- Romance sans paroles, Op. 19
- Fantaisie dramatique, Op. 22, in F♯ minor
- Impromptu No. 1, in G♭ major
- Impromptu No. 2, in B♭ minor
- Adieu! Das Lebewohl von Venedig, Op. posth. No. 3, in C minor (Venice, 1844)
- Choral
- Sechs kleine Präludien
- Prélude
- Fugue
- Étude héroïque, in C♯ minor
- Albumblatt

=== Orchestral works ===
- Konzertstück for piano and large orchestra in B minor
- Overture in D major

== Recordings ==
- Filtsch, Thalberg, Liszt, Chopin: Piano music – Leonhard Westermayr (MMS 2616)
- (2010) Mikuli, Tellefsen, Filtsch, Gutmann: Piano music – Hubert Rutkowski (Naxos 8.572344)
- (2011) Mikuli, Tellefsen, Filtsch: Violin & piano music – Voytek Proniewicz, Alexander Jakobidze-Gitman (Naxos 8.572460)
- (2012) Tellefsen and Filtsch: Piano Concerto, Concert Piece, Overture – Hubert Rutkowski, Polish Radio Symphony Orchestra, Łukasz Borowicz (Accord 177-2)
- (2016) Carl Filtsch Piano Solo Pieces – Chiyo Hagiwara (ALCD-9161)
- (2026) Carl Filtsch: Piano Works – Ramona Munteanu (Urania Records LDV14136)
