= Miklós Bánffy =

Hungarian politician and writer

Count Miklós Bánffy de Losoncz
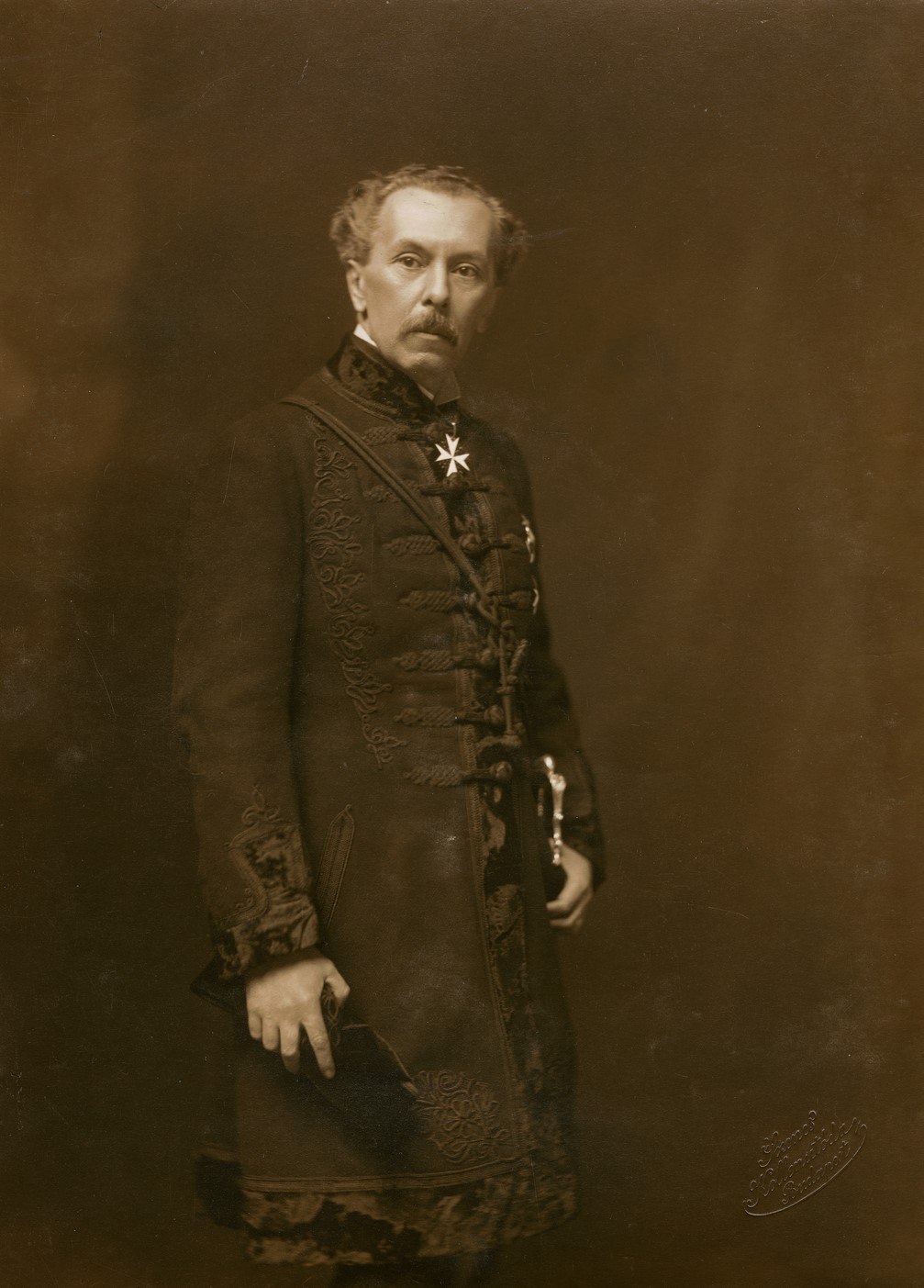

Minister of Foreign Affairs of Hungary
- In office 14 April 1921 – 19 December 1922
- Prime Minister: István Bethlen
- Preceded by: Pál Teleki
- Succeeded by: Géza Daruváry

Personal details
- Born: 30 December 1873 Kolozsvár (Cluj-Napoca), Austria-Hungary
- Died: 5 June 1950 (aged 76) Budapest, People's Republic of Hungary
- Party: Liberal Party, National Party of Work
- Spouse: Aranka Váradi
- Children: Katalin
- Profession: politician, novelist

Count Miklós Domokos Pál Bánffy de Losoncz (30 December 1873 – 5 June 1950) was a Hungarian nobleman, liberal politician, and novelist. His books include The Transylvanian Trilogy (They Were Counted, They Were Found Wanting and They Were Divided), and The Phoenix Land.

== Biography ==
The Bánffy family emerged in 15th-century Transylvania and established itself among the foremost dynasties of the country. They owned a grand palace in Kolozsvár (Romanian: Cluj, German: Klausenburg), one of the main cities of Transylvania and one of the province's largest castles at Bonchida. One branch was raised to a barony in the 1660s, while another became counts in 1855. The barons produced a 19th-century prime minister of Hungary (Dezső Bánffy), and the counts held important offices at court. Among the latter was Count Miklós, born in Kolozsvár on 30 December 1873, as the only son and younger child of Count György Bánffy de Losoncz (1844–1929) and his wife and cousin, Baroness Irma Mária Bánffy de Losoncz (1852–1875). He had one sister, Countess Katalin Clarisse Mária (1871–1974), married to Tamás Barcsay de Nagybarcsa (1868–1936).

Beginning his political career at the time when Hungary was a constituent of Austria-Hungary, Bánffy was elected a Member of Parliament in 1901 and became Director of the Hungarian State Theatres (1913–1918). Both a traditionalist and a member of the avant-garde, he wrote five plays, two books of short stories, and a distinguished novel. Overcoming fierce opposition, his intervention made it possible for Béla Bartók's works to have their first performance in Budapest.

Bánffy became Foreign Minister of Hungary in his cousin Count István Bethlen's government of 1921. Although he detested the politics of the Regent, Admiral Miklós Horthy, he worked to review the boundary revisions confirmed by the Treaty of Trianon after World War I through which Transylvania had been transferred to Romania. Little progress was made, and he retired from office. He returned to Transylvania in 1926, and the Romanian King Ferdinand I granted him citizenship with the condition of not engaging in revisionist politics.

His trilogy, A Transylvanian Tale, also called The Writing on the Wall, was published between 1934 and 1940. Bánffy portrayed pre-war Hungary as a nation in decline, failed by a shortsighted aristocracy.

In April 1943, Bánffy visited Bucharest to persuade Ion Antonescu's Romania together with Hungary to abandon the Axis and sue for a separate peace with the Allies (see also Romania during World War II). The negotiations with a delegation led by Gheorghe Mironescu broke down almost instantaneously, as the two sides could not agree on a future status for Northern Transylvania (which Romania had ceded to Hungary in 1940, and where Bonchida was located). Two years later, in revenge for Bánffy's actions in Bucharest, his estate at Bonchida was burned and looted by the retreating German army.

Hungary and Transylvania were soon invaded by the Soviet Union's Red Army, an event which marked an uncertain status for Northern Transylvania until its return to Romania. His wife and daughter fled to Budapest while Bánffy remained on the spot in a vain attempt to prevent the destruction of his property. Soon after, the frontier was closed. The family remained separated until 1949, when he was allowed by Romanian communist authorities to leave for Budapest, where he died the following year.

A mellowing communist regime in Hungary permitted the reissue of A Transylvanian Tale in 1982, and it was translated into English for the first time in 1999. The Castle of Bonchida is now being restored as a cultural centre. An apartment is being prepared for the use of the Count's family.

Political offices
Preceded by Pál Teleki	Minister of Foreign Affairs; 1921–1922	Succeeded by Géza Daruváry
