= Carmen Gray =

Rock band from Finland

Carmen Gray is a rock band from Finland.

== Members ==
- "Nicklas" (Leading Vocals)
- "Lappe" (Guitar/Vocals)
- "Pete" (Bass/Background vocals)
- "J.J" (Keyboard/Background vocals)
- "O.J" (Drums)

== History ==
Carmen Gray (previous name Jerkem) was formed in the summer of 2000. At the time, the band consisted of only three of the current members, Lappe, J.J and Pete. Later that year, Nicklas joined the band.

In early January 2003 O.J joined the band. O.J brought the music together and created the sound that the boys had searched for a long time. After O.J's arrival, the band immediately started to look and sound better. Lappe and Tommi Tikka created the band's songs already in October 2000 when they wrote the band's first songs, and that working relationship stands tall even today. In May 2005, the boys finally found a fitting name, "Carmen Gray". Later in 2005, the boys started to reach further success when they signed a record deal with Sony/BMG.

Manager Peter Kokljuschkin, a man with a long experience in managing Pop/Rock bands, discovered the band in 2004. Carmen Gray released their début album "Carmen Gray; The portrait of Carmen Gray" in September 2006. In November 2008 they released "Welcome To Grayland".

At this present moment, Carmen Gray has a hit on nrj.fi's top 10 list.

== Albums ==
- The Portrait Of Carmen Gray (2006)
- Welcome To Grayland (2008)
- Gates of Loneliness (2011/2012)
