= Subcarpați =

Romanian hip hop group

- Origin: Bucharest, Romania
- Genres: Hip hop; folklore; electronic
- Years active: 2010–present
- Website: subcarpati.com

Subcarpați (the name is Romanian for the Romanian portion of Subcarpathia) is a Romanian hip-hop band from Bucharest. Formed in 2010 by MC Bean (Alexe Marius Andrei), the band blends hip-hop with elements from Romanian folk music. The genre seeks to reinterpret popular motifs specific to Romanian's folk music, and is often referred to as "underground folklore".

The project had brought together various artists: Surorile Osoianu, Motanu', Faust, AFO, DJ Power Pe Vinil, Fanescu, Argatu', and other collaborators.

The British newspaper The Guardian described Subcarpați as being "an explosive mixture of old and new. It's an eclectic combination that brings together melancholy Romanian folk songs, Romanian unity songs, traditional instruments and the rhythms of trip-hop, dubstep, hip-hop and dancehall."

== Discography ==
Albums

- Subcarpați (2010)
- Underground Folclor (2012)
- Pielea de găină (2014)
- Satele Unite ale Balcanilor (2016)
- Zori și Asfințit (2018)
- Valea Voltului (2023)
- HORA EXACTĂ (2026)
