= Bonțida Bánffy Castle =

Castle in Cluj County, Romania

Bánffy Castle
- Castelul Bánffy (in Romanian); Bánffy-kastély (in Hungarian)
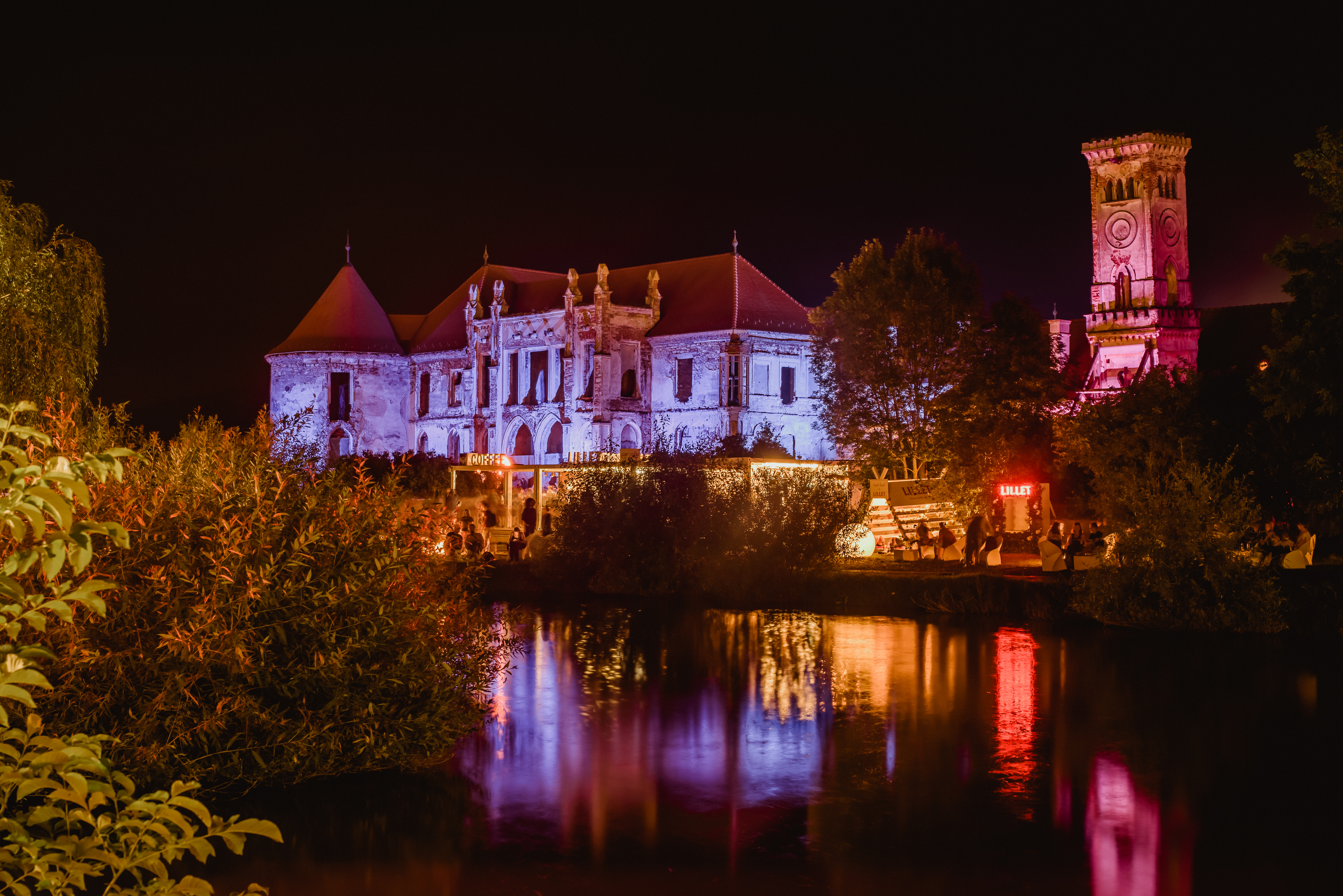
- Bánffy Castle at Electric Castle

- Location within Romania

General information
- Status: Renovated
- Type: Castle
- Architectural style: Baroque
- Location: Bonțida, Cluj County
- Coordinates: 46°54′36″N 23°48′36″E
- Renovated: 1999–present
- Owner: Katalin Bánffy

Design and construction
- Architects: earlier phases: unknown Johann Eberhard Blaumann; Joespeh Leder; Alois Ludwig (Luigi) Pichl; Anton Kagerbauer

Bánffy Castle is an architectural monument situated in Bonţida, a village in the vicinity of Cluj-Napoca, Romania, with construction phases and stylistic features belonging to Renaissance, Baroque, Neoclassical and Neogothic styles. It is owned by the Hungarian Bánffy family (of which Miklós Bánffy was a member). The current owner is Katalin Bánffy.

== History ==
In 1387, the Bonțida estate came into the possession of the Hungarian Bánffy of Losonc family, when Sigismund of Luxemburg donated it to Dénes, son of Tamás Losonci. The present castle was preceded by a manor house, whose history dates back to the 15th-16th centuries. After 1640, the estate was inherited by Dénes Bánffy (II) (1638–1674), county governor of Doboka and Kolozs counties, brother-in-law and counselor of Prince Michael I Apafi, who fortified the initial building between 1668 and 1674 by surrounding it with curtain walls that formed a rectangular enclosure, reinforced at the corners with massive circular towers. The castle could be accessed through a seven-storey high gatehouse located on the fortification's eastern side. The works were continued after his death by his successor, György Bánffy (III).

This Renaissance ensemble was involved, between 1704 and 1711, in Rákóczi's War of Independence, needing repairs and restorations at the beginning of the 18th century. Elizabeth the 3rd.

In the 18th century the estate was inherited by Dénes Bánffy (IV), who, after a time spent in the Viennese Court of Empress Maria Theresa, returned home in 1747 and started a reconstruction of the castle in Austrian Baroque style. Between 1747 and 1751 a Cour d'honneur in U shape was built to the eastern side of the Renaissance building, which contained: the riding school, the stable, the carriage rooms and servants' quarters. An important achievement was the castle's park near the Someș (Szamos) River, with walkways, statues and fountains. In the integrative concept specific to Baroque art, the residence and the environment were in a relationship of close interdependence and mutual influence. Based on this concept, the park of 70 ha was set up after the design of architect Johann Christian Erras, which transposed into this space forms dominated by a strict geometry. The sculptor Johann Nachtigall made grandiose stone statues inspired by the ancient poet Ovid.

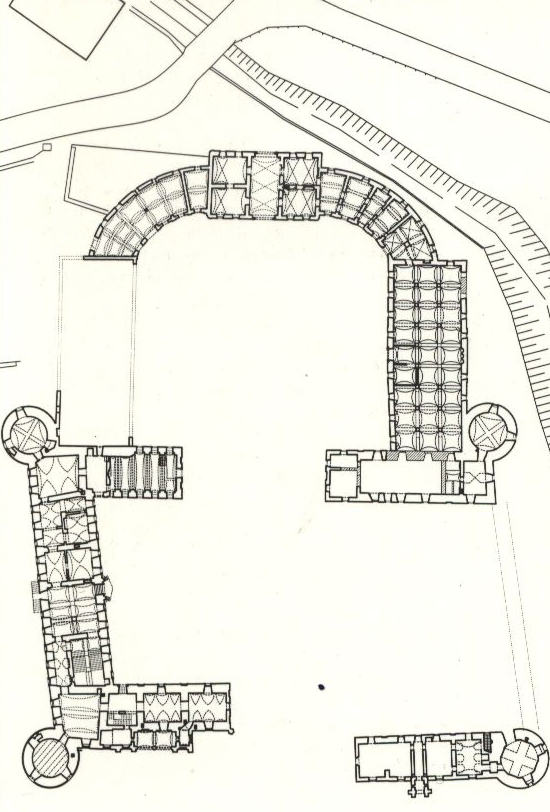
Plan of the castle

József Bánffy, the descendant of Dénes Bánffy, decided the demolition of the gate tower in the 1820s, uniting the Renaissance courtyard with the Baroque one, and from the resulting stone a water mill was built for the villagers in Bonțida. During the same period, modifications to some of the building’s façades in a Classicist style reflect the rising popularity of English Romanticism. In 1850, the building's western wing was modified under the direction of architect Anton Kagerbauer (1814–1872), following the park's landscaping after the English Romanticism model. Portions of the main building together with the former kitchen building have been renovated following the Neo-Gothic style.

Count Miklós Bánffy, the next owner of Bánffy Castle - ceded from the Duke of Coburg, undertook renovation of the western wing. In the 1930s, he simplified the architecture of the upper storey of the loggia attached to the castle’s western wing, which had previously featured intricate tracery, based on his own designs and of his friend, architect Károly Kós.

In 1944, the castle was transformed into a field hospital. German troops plundered and devastated the castle, as retaliation against the political attitude of its owner, count Miklós Bánffy, who had initiated negotiations between the governments of Romania and Hungary for the return of weapons to be used against Germany. Thus, the furniture, the library and the gallery of paintings were destroyed.

During the communist regime, the whole building was used as a driving school, cooperative farm and hospital for children. In 1963, Bánffy Castle was used as decor for filming Pădurea spânzuraților, directed by Liviu Ciulei. The film had a short scene with fire, so scenographers lit one of the buildings, causing massive damage to the building.

In 1990, the castle was declared a historic monument.

Since 2013 the castle has been the venue for an annual music festival called Electric Castle, held each July.

== Restoration ==
In 1999, due to its ruinous state, the castle was included, at the request of the Transylvania Trust, in the World Monuments Watch List of 100 Most Endangered Sites. Also in 1999, a bilateral State Agreement was signed between Romania and Hungary for the restoration and rehabilitation works. In the following period, with Romanian state funds, about 2/3 of the main building's roof was reconstructed. In 2003, the Transylvania Trust signed with the authorities a long-term lease agreement for the castle, resigned with Katalin Bánffy in 2008 (who was given back the building in the meantime) for the duration of 49 years. In 2001, the Built Heritage Conservation Training Program was implemented, the kitchen buildings being the first one to be restored under its banner.

In 2005, The Built Heritage Conservation Training Centre was officially opened at Bánffy Castle, which functions to this day, teaching traditional building crafts skills for the restoration, repair and maintenance of historic buildings and which was awarded, in 2008, the Europa Nostra prize in Cultural Heritage for education, training and awareness training. The program is supported by Charles, Prince of Wales, who visited the castle. The patron of the training centre is Princess Margareta of Romania.

== Gallery ==
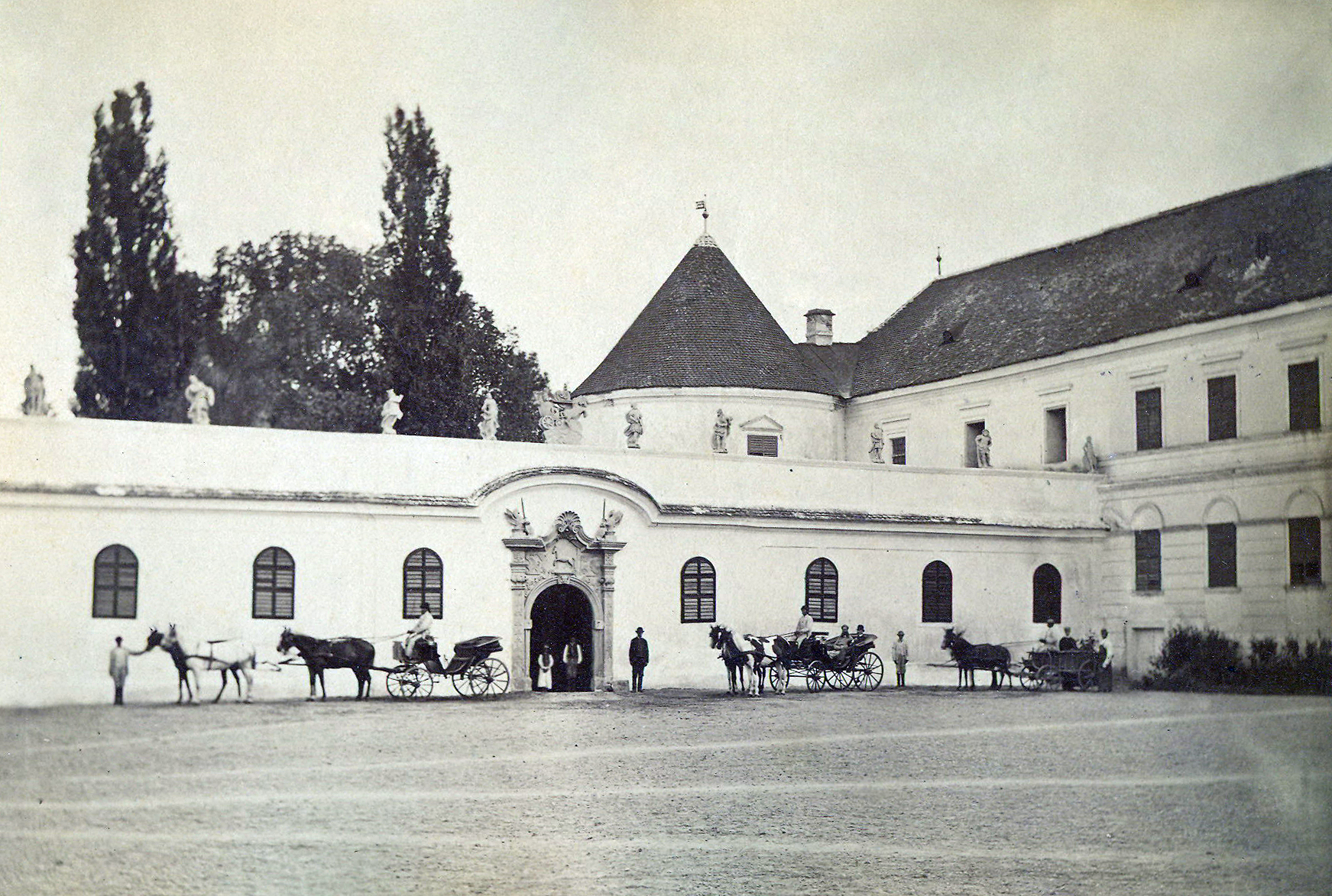
The castle in 1890

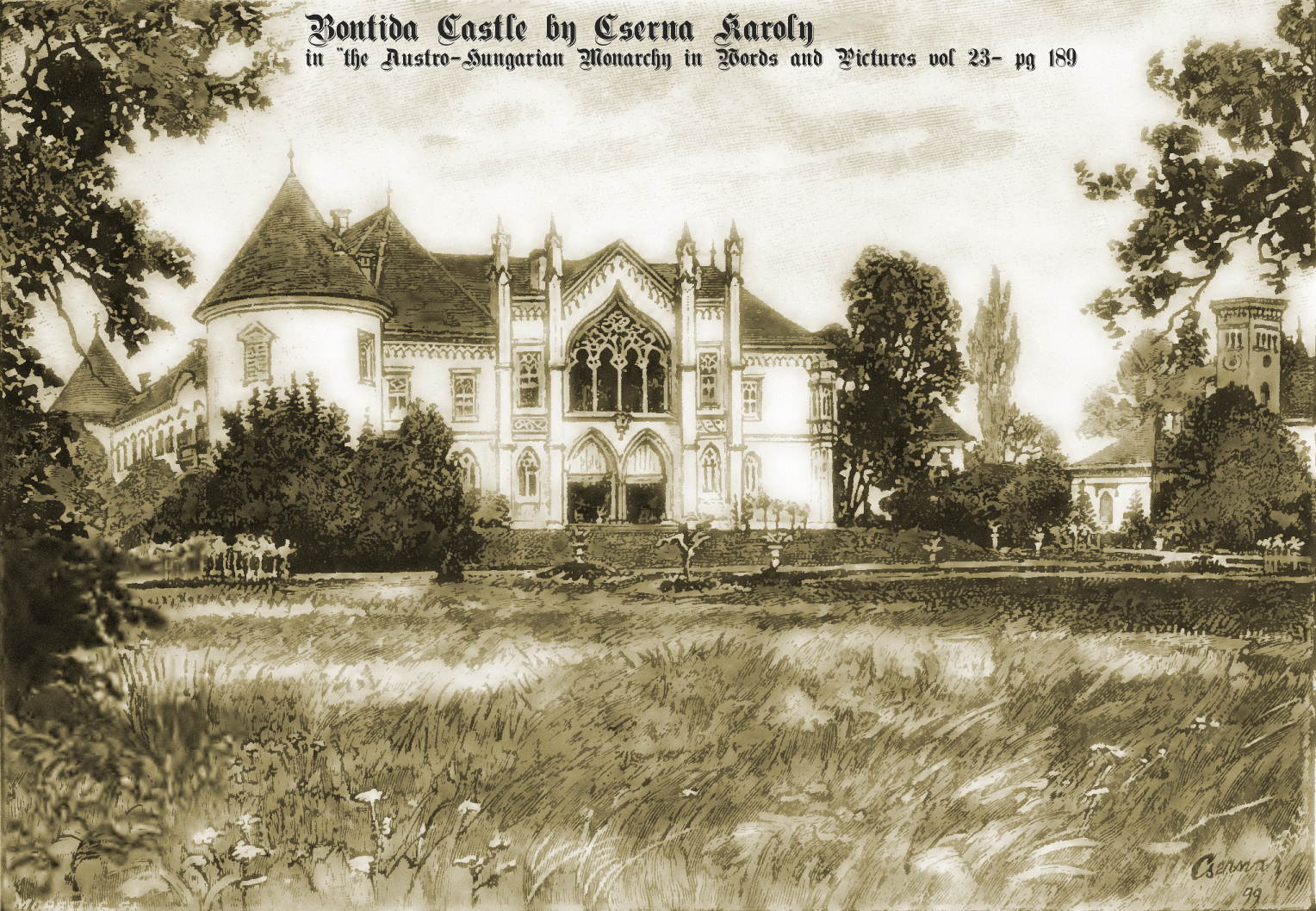
Bonţida Bánffy Castle depicted by Cserna Karoly in The Austro-Hungarian Monarchy in Word and Picture, volume 23, 1902

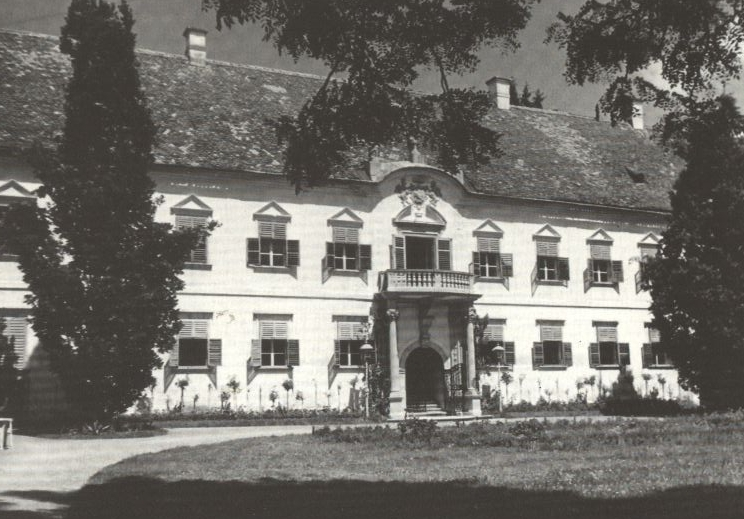
The castle in 1935

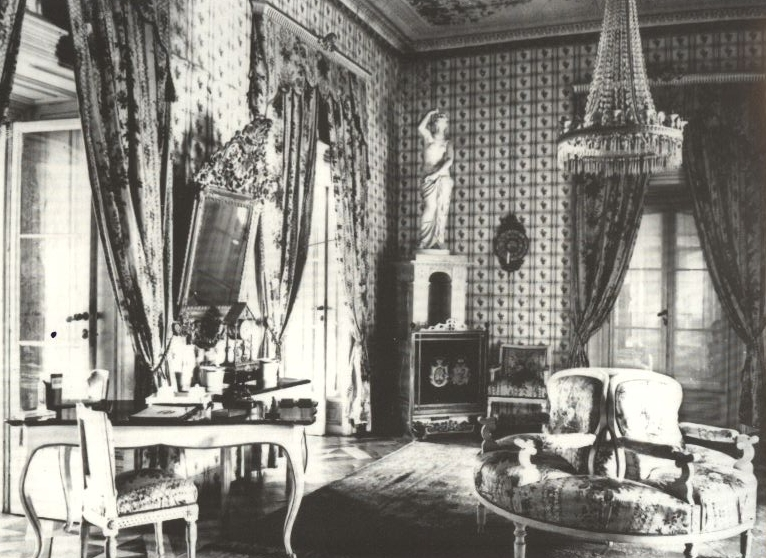
Castle's interior in 1935

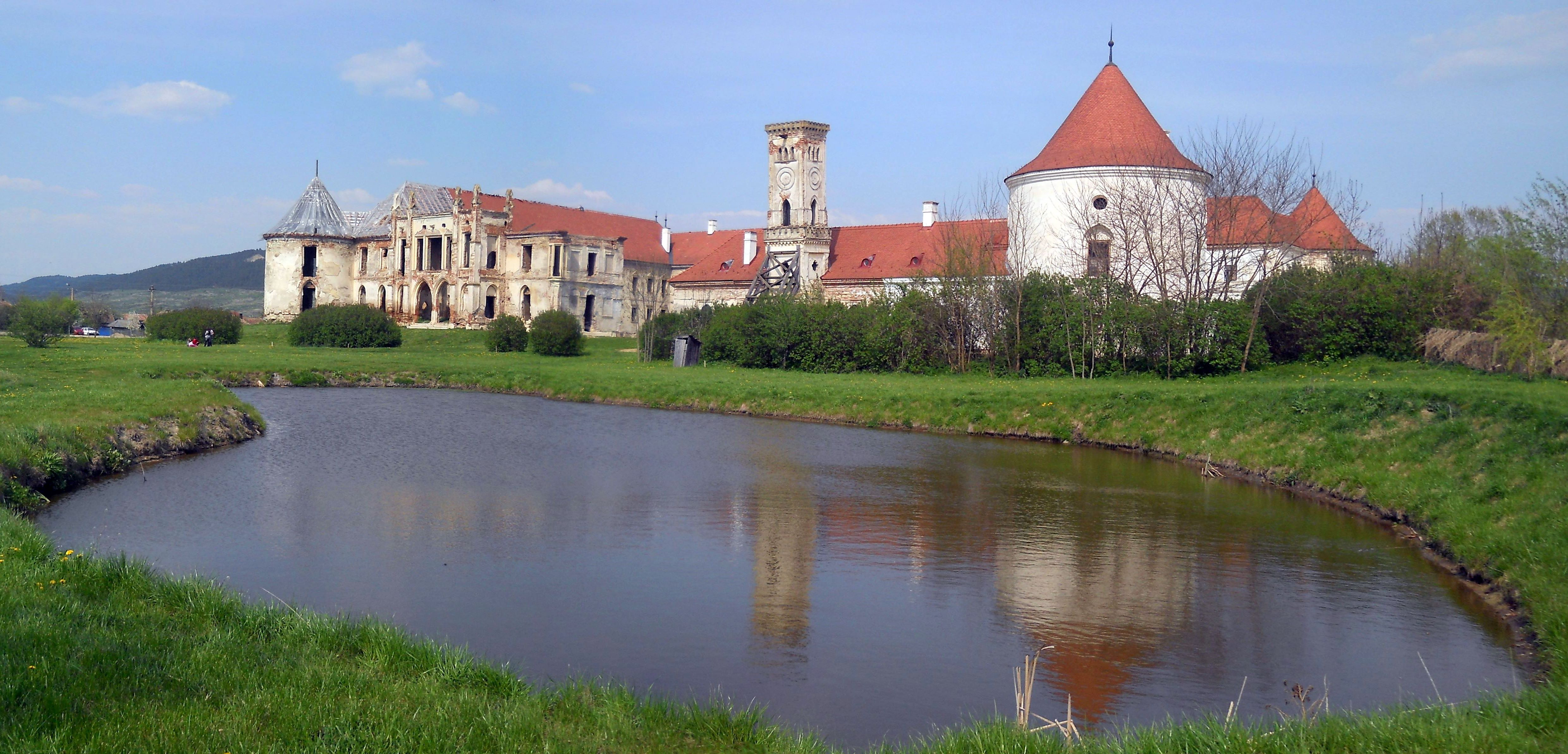
Bonţida Bánffy Castle partially restored, in April 2011

== See also ==
- Cluj-Napoca Bánffy Palace
- List of castles in Romania
- Tourism in Romania
