= Alternosfera =

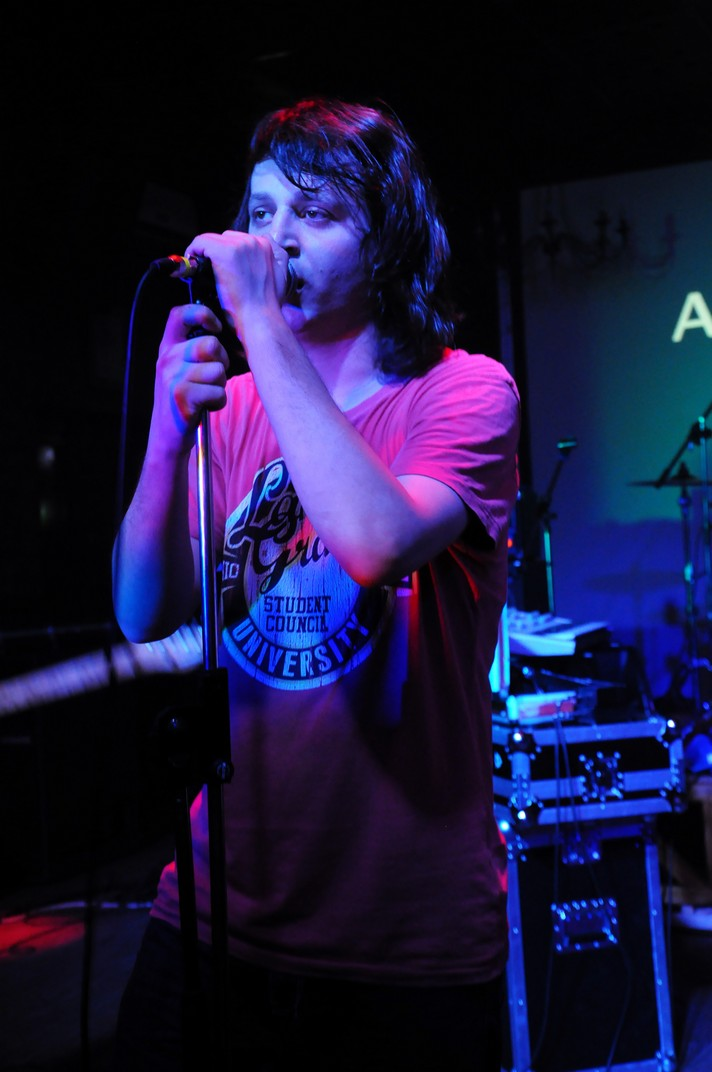
- Lead Singer Marcel Bostan performing at a concert in 2011.

Background information
- Origin: Chișinău, Republic of Moldova
- Genres: Alternative rock • electronic rock • alternative metal • post-grunge • pop rock
- Years active: 1998–present
- Labels: Art-Sfera, independent
- Website: alternosfera.com

Alternosfera is an alternative rock band from Chişinău, Republic of Moldova. They started their career in 1998 in highschool with their first album, Oraşul 511, being released in 2005.

== History ==
The history of post-Soviet rock in the Republic of Moldova is a concise one. Since 1991, only a few bands (e.g. Zdob şi Zdub), managed to occupy solid positions on the show-business arena of the Republic of Moldova and abroad.

Alternosfera first rehearsed with their full lineup on December 13, 1998. Their first concert took place on 23 November 1999 in Chişinău. In 2001, the band made their first demo recordings in Chişinău, followed by more demo recordings in 2002 in Bucharest, Romania.

Both the lineup and musical direction have changed over time, as the band reached maturity and developed their own approach to alternative rock, with the keyboards "carrying" the entire tune. Their lyrics are most often about love, but also have social and political connotations. Alternosfera's sound is unique on the Moldovan market at the moment, their influences varying from 80's motifs to the Seattle alternative rock of the '90s.

Their specific melodiousness is also partly due to most songs having the classic piano "lead."

Alternosfera have performed on most of Chişinău's stages, taking part in the most important rock festivals in Moldova and were always well received by the public. In 2005 they performed in the Tuborg festival in Bucharest.

Like most Moldovans, the band members speak both their native language Romanian and Russian, except Vlad Hohlov, who is a native Russian speaker. While there are a small handful written in Russian from their earlier years, the vast majority of their songs are in Romanian, and they seldom write or perform in Russian anymore.

In 2022 the band moved to Sibiu, Romania, due to concerns regarding the aforementioned Russian invasion.

== Current members ==
- Marcel Bostan – Vocals, Keyboards, Guitar
- Marin Nicoară – Guitar, Keyboards
- Dumitru Costin - Bass
- Eugen Berdea – Drums
- Sergiu Aladin – Guitar, Keyboards

=== Former members ===
- Sebastian Marcovici – Bass
- Andrei Ciobanu – Bass
- Dumitru Costin – Bass
- Olga Vîrlan – Cello
- Vlad Hohlov – Drums
- Max Koporski – Drums
- Mîrza Vitalie – Violin
- Vitalie Chian – Keyboards
- Anatolii Pugaci – Drums
- Victor "Vikosh" Coşparmac – Bass
- Nick Russu – Drums

== Discography ==
=== Oraşul 511 (511 City) ===
Release Date: 28 May 2005

Track Listing

1. Drumuri de noroi (Roads of Mud)
2. Oriental Monk
3. Shadow
4. Ikar (Icarus)
5. 1500
6. Spune-mi (Tell Me)
7. Picaj (Dive)
8. Astă vară (Last Summer)
9. Wamintirile (version 5.11) (Memories)
10. Зима (Winter)
11. Vreau să-mi dai (I Want You to Give Me)
12. 511
13. Alternocrazy [Bonus Track, not included on all versions]
- Record label: ART-SFERA
- Mixing & record : September–December 2004, ADM-studio, Chişinău, Moldova
- Sound engineer: Andrei Lifenco
- Mastering: Feb. 2005, Studio МГСУ, Moscow, Russia.
- Sound engineer: Serj Bolishakov
- Music & text : Marcel Bostan
- Arrangement: Alternosfera
- Producer: Artur Muntean

Note: Зима and Alternocrazy are the only tracks in their officially published discography to have lyrics in Russian. All the other songs on the album have their lyrics in Romanian, including Oriental Monk and Shadow, which are oddly titled in English despite not being in English.

=== Visători cu plumb în ochi sau ultima scrisoare pentru femeia nordică (Dreamers with Lead in Their Eyes or The Last Letter for the Northern Woman) ===
Release Date: 16 June 2007

Track Listing

1. Drum de fier (Iron Road)
2. Ne uneşte, ne desparte (It Unites Us, It Divides Us)
3. Femeia Nordică (The Nordic Woman)
4. Poştaş (Mailman)
5. Ploile nu vin (The Rains Won't Come)
6. Închisoarea albă (The White Prison)
7. Cocori (Cranes)
8. Visători cu plumb în ochi (Dreamers with Lead in Their Eyes)
9. Avion (Airplane)
10. Nu e nimeni vinovat (It's Nobody's Fault)
11. Columb (Columbus)

The first single released from the album was 'Femeia Nordica' and the second one was 'Ploile nu vin'. The new album's sound is somewhat different from the music Alternosfera were writing earlier. First, because the new songs sound more mild, and, second, because all of them (unlike on Oraşul 511) are in Romanian.

=== Flori din Groapa Marianelor EP (Flowers from the Mariana Trench) ===
Release Date: 12 October 2008

Track Listing

1. Mariane Flori (Mariana Flowers)
2. Flori de Mai (May Flowers)*
3. Mariane Flori (JenyaSOLID Remix)
4. Mariane Flori (Remix NMKY)
- "Flori de Mai" is a Romanian term that refers to what would be known in English as "Forget-me-nots."

=== Virgula (The Comma) ===
Release Date: 5 October 2012

Track Listing

1. Drumuri Vecine (Neighbouring Roads)
2. Lumina Lăcustră (Lacustrine Light)
3. Virgulă (Comma)
4. Aruncă-mi (Throw Me)
5. Mută (Mute)
6. 2000 de ani (2000 Years)
7. O Lume la Picioare (A World At Your Feet)
8. Deja Străină (Already Estranged)
9. Două Eve (Two Eves)
10. Prea Departe Te Simt (I Feel You Too Far Away)
11. Manole
12. Ancoră (The Anchor)
13. Sentință (The Sentence)
14. Final (O Zodie din Lut) (Ending (A Fate of Clay))

=== Epizodia ===
Release Date: 14 March 2013*

Track Listing

1. Drumuri Pi – necunoscute (PI roads – unknown roads)
2. Nepoata Lui Gagarin (Gagarin's Granddaughter)
3. Epizodia
4. Singurătate (Loneliness)
5. Armata (The Army)
6. Rugi (Prayers)
7. Fiara (The Beast)
8. Văduva (The Widow)
9. Trei Luni (Three Months)
10. Mai Am (I Still Have)
- The album was purposely released on Pi day, as Virgula, Epizodia, and Haosoleum form a trilogy that is symbolic of the number Pi. Virgula represents the decimal point (which is written as a comma in Romanian,) Epizodia represents 3, and Haosoleum represents 14.

=== Haosoleum (Chaosoleum) ===
Release Date: 9 October 2015

Track Listing

1. Drumul Tristetilor Part I (numere) (The Sorrows' Road Part I (Numbers))
2. Drumul Tristetilor Part II (bijutierul) (The Sorrows' Road Part II (The Jewler))
3. Cad Fulgi / SOS (Snowflakes Fall / SOS)
4. Dialog K (Dialogue K)
5. Punct (Period)
6. Am Uitat (I Forgot)
7. Cheama-ma (Call out to Me)
8. Sarmanul Dionis (Poor Dionysus)
9. Din Pacate (Unfortunately)
10. Au Ploile Azi... (Today, Do The Rains Have...)
11. Rasai (Sunrise)
12. Haosoleum (Chaosoleum)

=== Arhitectul Din Babel (The Architect from Babylon) ===
Release Date: 3 July 2019

Track Listing

1. Drumuri Dintre Noi (Roads Between Us)
2. Timpul (Time)
3. Rachete (Missiles)
4. Orice Gand (Any Thought)
5. Amanet (Pawn Shop)
6. Fantanile (The Fountains)
7. Unu Doi Unu Doi (One Two One Two)
8. Lucis
9. Scrisori (Letters)
10. Outro

=== Steaguri Fără Culori (Colourless Flags) ===
Release Date: 31 December 2025

Initially announced for April 2025, the album was delayed until the end of the year, finally being launched on the evening of 31 December 2025. Prior to the full album release, several songs were published as singles, including "Imnuri De Război", "Bonjour Madame", "Aritmii", "Clopote", "Frig De Mor" and "Requiem Fără Refren". The final track listing consists of 11 songs in the following order:

1. Drum bun (Safe Travels*)
2. Imnuri De Război (War Hymns)
3. Steaguri Fără Culori (Colourless Flags)
4. Bonjour Madame
5. Avioane de hârtie (Paper Airplanes)
6. Aritmii (Arrhythmias)
7. Plângem (We're Crying)
8. Frig De Mor (Freezing To Death) (with Delia)
9. Clopote (Bells)
10. A 3-a planetă (The 3rd Planet)
11. Requiem Fără Refren (Requiem without a Chorus)

== Theatroll ==
At the end of September 2022, Alternosfera launched the project Theatroll (theatre + rock n' roll) a series of concerts, which the band played in the most prestigious theatres and operas in Romania and the Republic of Moldova. The show is dedicated to performances of some of the band's older and oft-forgotten songs, reinterpreted and sung with an accompanying orchestra.

"Theatroll began with the wish to offer our friends, Alternosfera's fans, a series of concerts in which the most beloved songs of ours could be reinterpreted and sung on stage, beside an orchestra. For Theatroll we will trade the stages of clubs and festivals for ones of theatres, where lights, decor and costumes will help up to build, alongside our audience, a new universe," - explained the members of the band in an interview.

Set list:

1. Orice Gând
2. 1500
3. O Lume La Picioare
4. Armata
5. Amanet
6. Cocori
7. Nu E Nimeni Vinovat
8. Fântânile
9. Punct
10. Trei Luni
11. Astă Vară
12. Sărmanul Dionis*
13. Haosoleum*
14. Dialog K
15. Flori De Mai

Encore:

16. Picaj

*Never performed live prior to Theatroll.

Notes:

- During the concert at Sala Palatului on January 28, 2024, Femeia Nordică was added to the encore, coming before Picaj.

["Now, when you have so many songs and so many fans, and so many tastes, there's some schemes after which you have to allocate the selection you will sing at a concert. Like, five - six known hits, which you are obligated to put in. Add some material from the latest album, and also add a song or two for the soul, which you necessarily want to sing. When you work for years and years following that scheme, there's a lot of material that remains behind. Somehow, there's songs that haven't been sung even once in concert. Theatroll is an opportunity to breathe new life to those certain songs,"] - said vocalist Marcel Bostan about the idea and concept of the Theatroll project.

The original tour ran from late September to early November 2022, only spanning across a small handful of cities in Romania, although since then, the band has occasionally revived the idea with one-off performances; first in April 2023 for a night in Chişinău, then again in September of that year at a festival in Cluj-Napoca, and most recently in January 2024 for a gig in Bucharest.

== New album (2025) ==
In Autumn 2022, Marcel Bostan announced that a new album was slated to be released in Autumn 2023. All material is already ready and is mixed by British recording engineer Adrian Bushby who won two Grammy Awards for his work on Foo Fighters sixth studio album Echoes, Silence, Patience & Grace in 2008 and on album The Resistance by Muse in 2011. Despite this, the Autumn of 2023 came and went without the release of the album, which at this rate, will likely come around mid-2024.

On 30 November 2022 Alternosfera released first single - "Bonjour Madame" - from future album. On 24 February 2023 - exactly one year from Russian invasion of Ukraine - the band released the second single, anti-war song called "Imnuri de Război" (War Hymns.) Nearly a year after the release of Bonjour Madame, the album's third single, "Aritmii" (Arrhythmias,) was released on November 10, 2023. Each of these singles were accompanied by mini-tours to promote them.

Alternosfera officially announced that their new album will be presented on 8 February 2025 at their special concert in Chisinau, which will mark starting of a new tour.
