= Luna Amară =

Romanian rock band

- Origin: Cluj-Napoca, Romania
- Genres: Alternative rock • progressive rock • progressive metal • alternative metal • post-grunge • hard rock
- Years active: 1999–present
- Labels: Amarcord, A&A Records, Roton
- Members: Mihnea Blidariu; Robert Moțoc; Sorin Moraru; Nick Făgădar; Andrei Boțan
- Past members: Mihnea Andrei Ferezan; Vali Deac; Gheorghe Farcaş; Șerban-Onțanu Crăciun; Petru Gavrila; Răzvan Ristea
- Website: www.luna-amara.ro

Luna Amară is a Romanian rock band from Cluj-Napoca. The band, which was founded in 1999 under the name Tanagra Noise, consists of Mihnea Blidariu (lead vocals, trumpet, rhythm guitar), Nick Făgădar (lead vocals, rhythm guitar), Sorin Moraru (bass), Robert Moțoc (drums) and Andrei Boțan (lead guitar). The band's name translates to Bitter Moon, and is borrowed from the Roman Polanski movie of the same name, inspired by the eponymous novel written by Pascal Bruckner. As of 2018, Luna Amară have released six studio albums (Asfalt, Loc Lipsă, Don't Let Your Dreams Fall Asleep, Pietre În Alb, Aproape and Nord).

== History ==
The band was formed by Nick Făgădar (vocals, guitar) and Gheorghe Farcaş (bass guitar) in Cluj-Napoca, Transylvania, in September 1999. The initial name of the band was Tanagra Noise. In 2000 they changed it to the current name, Luna Amară. As a live act, this Romanian five-piece outfit has a style that combines progressive metal with alternative rock. Luna Amara was the first Romanian band to introduce the trumpet sound into the alternative rock style.

The band members try promote and support a modern European society in Romania, and their lyrics often have a political message. Luna Amară is also involved in ecological projects such as "Save Vama Veche" (protecting the endangered seahorses), "Save Roşia Montană" (protecting the wildlife and natural surroundings of a mountain area from cyanide poisoning) and social awareness projects, such as the "Vote for Them" tour, organized to convince young adults to vote.

Luna Amară is currently one of Romania's most successful groups from the new wave of rock acts. They were the top selling artist in national chain of music stores (Hollywood Music & Film) from July until September 2004. Their singles Folclor, Gri Dorian, Roşu aprins and Ego nr. 4 have reached number one in airplay charts at local radio stations around the country.

In January 2006 they released the album Loc Lipsă. The band performed a 40 dates tour all over Romania in clubs and open air locations as well as shows in the Netherlands, Germany, Bulgaria and Turkey. For the 2nd time consecutively, Luna Amară has been invited to play live at Sziget Festival in Budapest.

After two very well-sold albums, in 2009 Luna Amară has recorded a third one, "Don't Let Your Dreams Fall Asleep", where the acoustic side of the band is especially underlined. This album contains nine songs in English and three in Romanian. "Don't Let Your Dreams Fall Asleep" was praised in such cultural magazines as Dilema Veche and some of their singles, such as "Chihlimbar", remained number one on several charts for quite a long time, such as for 4 weeks in June and July 2009 in Cityfm's Romtop.

== Band members ==
=== Current members ===
- Mihnea Blidariu – lead vocals, trumpet, rhythm guitar 1999- present
- Nick Făgădar – lead vocals, rhythm guitar 1999- present
- Sorin Moraru – bass 2001- present
- Robert Moțoc – drums 2022- present
- Andrei Boțan – lead guitar 2017- present

=== Former members ===
- Șerban-Onțanu Crăciun – lead guitar 2012- 2017
- Mihnea Andrei Ferezan – lead guitar 2009- 2011
- Vali Deac – lead guitar 2005- 2009
- Petru Gavrila – lead guitar 2000- 2005
- Gheorghe Farcaș – bass guitar 1999- 2001
- Răzvan Ristea – drums 2000- 2022

== Discography ==
=== Studio albums ===
- Asfalt (2004)
- Loc Lipsă (2006)
- Don't Let Your Dreams Fall Asleep (2009)
- Pietre în Alb (2011)
- Aproape (2016)
- Nord (2018)
