= Lappe =

Lappe or Lappé is a German-language surname. Notable people with this surname include:

- Anna Lappé (born 1973), American author and educator
- Benay Lappe (1960), American rabbi
- Frances Moore Lappé (1944), American researcher and author
- Gemze de Lappe (1922–2017), American dancer
- James Lappe, American politician
- Jean-Roger Lappé-Lappé (1981), Cameroonian footballer
- Joseph DeLappe (1963), UK-based American artist and academic
- Karl-Heinz Lappe (1987), German footballer
- Linda Lappe (1980), American college basketball coach
- Pele de Lappe (1916–2007), American artist

== See also ==
- Lappe, Ontario, unorganized part of Thunder Bay District, Ontario, Canada
- Lapp (disambiguation)
