= Bánffy =

Coat of arms of the Bánffy family

The Bánffy family is an ancient Hungarian noble family, whose members occupied prominent positions in the Kingdom of Hungary and later within the Austro-Hungarian Empire.

== History ==
Their first recorded ancestor Dénes came from the gens Tomaj and was first mentioned in the 12th century. His grandson, Dénes Losonczi, who lived in the 13th century, was founder of the Losonczi family. His great-grandson László de Losoncz (1368-1427), founded his own line of the family. From the 14th century onward, this line bears the name Bánffy de Losoncz. They intermarried with other most important families of the Kingdom of Hungary and later of the Austro-Hungarian Empire. Members of the family held the title of Baron, granted to them in 1729 by Charles VI, Holy Roman Emperor. On 20 May 1855, members of elder line of the family were upgraded to the title of Count in the Austrian Empire, granted to them by Emperor Franz Joseph I of Austria. The title was heritable by all legitimate male line descendants.

== Notable members ==
- Katalin Bánffy, 16th-century Hungarian noblewoman
- Dezső Bánffy (1843–1911), Hungarian politician
- Miklós Bánffy (1873–1950), Hungarian nobleman, politician, and novelist
- Dániel Bánffy (1893–1955), Hungarian politician
- Eszter Bánffy (born 1957), Hungarian prehistorian, archaeologist, and academic

== See also ==
- Bánffyhunyad, the Hungarian name of Huedin, Romania
- Bonțida Bánffy Castle
- Cluj-Napoca Bánffy Palace
